

23001–23100 

|-bgcolor=#d6d6d6
| 23001 ||  || — || November 5, 1999 || Socorro || LINEAR || HYG || align=right | 10 km || 
|-id=002 bgcolor=#fefefe
| 23002 Jillhirsch ||  ||  || November 9, 1999 || Socorro || LINEAR || V || align=right | 2.3 km || 
|-id=003 bgcolor=#fefefe
| 23003 Ziminski ||  ||  || November 9, 1999 || Socorro || LINEAR || NYS || align=right | 2.2 km || 
|-id=004 bgcolor=#E9E9E9
| 23004 ||  || — || November 9, 1999 || Catalina || CSS || WAT || align=right | 6.6 km || 
|-id=005 bgcolor=#E9E9E9
| 23005 ||  || — || November 9, 1999 || Catalina || CSS || EUN || align=right | 6.3 km || 
|-id=006 bgcolor=#d6d6d6
| 23006 Pazden ||  ||  || November 13, 1999 || Socorro || LINEAR || — || align=right | 3.3 km || 
|-id=007 bgcolor=#fefefe
| 23007 ||  || — || November 13, 1999 || Catalina || CSS || FLO || align=right | 2.4 km || 
|-id=008 bgcolor=#d6d6d6
| 23008 Rebeccajohns ||  ||  || November 14, 1999 || Socorro || LINEAR || — || align=right | 3.3 km || 
|-id=009 bgcolor=#d6d6d6
| 23009 ||  || — || November 14, 1999 || Socorro || LINEAR || — || align=right | 10 km || 
|-id=010 bgcolor=#fefefe
| 23010 Kathyfinch ||  ||  || November 14, 1999 || Socorro || LINEAR || FLO || align=right | 1.9 km || 
|-id=011 bgcolor=#fefefe
| 23011 Petach ||  ||  || November 14, 1999 || Socorro || LINEAR || ERI || align=right | 6.2 km || 
|-id=012 bgcolor=#d6d6d6
| 23012 ||  || — || November 14, 1999 || Socorro || LINEAR || HYG || align=right | 5.3 km || 
|-id=013 bgcolor=#fefefe
| 23013 Carolsmyth ||  ||  || November 14, 1999 || Socorro || LINEAR || — || align=right | 3.0 km || 
|-id=014 bgcolor=#E9E9E9
| 23014 Walstein ||  ||  || November 15, 1999 || Socorro || LINEAR || — || align=right | 3.2 km || 
|-id=015 bgcolor=#d6d6d6
| 23015 ||  || — || November 6, 1999 || Socorro || LINEAR || — || align=right | 8.6 km || 
|-id=016 bgcolor=#E9E9E9
| 23016 Michaelroche ||  ||  || November 15, 1999 || Socorro || LINEAR || — || align=right | 3.5 km || 
|-id=017 bgcolor=#E9E9E9
| 23017 Advincula ||  ||  || November 15, 1999 || Socorro || LINEAR || — || align=right | 3.9 km || 
|-id=018 bgcolor=#fefefe
| 23018 Annmoriarty ||  ||  || November 15, 1999 || Socorro || LINEAR || NYS || align=right | 2.6 km || 
|-id=019 bgcolor=#E9E9E9
| 23019 Thomgregory ||  ||  || November 3, 1999 || Socorro || LINEAR || WIT || align=right | 2.3 km || 
|-id=020 bgcolor=#fefefe
| 23020 ||  || — || November 27, 1999 || Višnjan Observatory || K. Korlević || — || align=right | 3.4 km || 
|-id=021 bgcolor=#E9E9E9
| 23021 ||  || — || November 28, 1999 || Oizumi || T. Kobayashi || — || align=right | 5.2 km || 
|-id=022 bgcolor=#d6d6d6
| 23022 ||  || — || November 28, 1999 || Oizumi || T. Kobayashi || KOR || align=right | 4.4 km || 
|-id=023 bgcolor=#d6d6d6
| 23023 ||  || — || November 28, 1999 || Višnjan Observatory || K. Korlević || KOR || align=right | 5.6 km || 
|-id=024 bgcolor=#d6d6d6
| 23024 ||  || — || November 28, 1999 || Višnjan Observatory || K. Korlević || — || align=right | 4.1 km || 
|-id=025 bgcolor=#d6d6d6
| 23025 ||  || — || November 30, 1999 || Oizumi || T. Kobayashi || 7:4 || align=right | 17 km || 
|-id=026 bgcolor=#d6d6d6
| 23026 ||  || — || November 30, 1999 || Oizumi || T. Kobayashi || EOS || align=right | 12 km || 
|-id=027 bgcolor=#E9E9E9
| 23027 ||  || — || November 30, 1999 || Kitt Peak || Spacewatch || — || align=right | 5.2 km || 
|-id=028 bgcolor=#d6d6d6
| 23028 ||  || — || December 4, 1999 || Catalina || CSS || 7:4 || align=right | 11 km || 
|-id=029 bgcolor=#d6d6d6
| 23029 ||  || — || December 4, 1999 || Catalina || CSS || — || align=right | 6.7 km || 
|-id=030 bgcolor=#d6d6d6
| 23030 Jimkennedy ||  ||  || December 4, 1999 || Fountain Hills || C. W. Juels || — || align=right | 20 km || 
|-id=031 bgcolor=#fefefe
| 23031 ||  || — || December 3, 1999 || Socorro || LINEAR || FLO || align=right | 2.2 km || 
|-id=032 bgcolor=#E9E9E9
| 23032 Fossey ||  ||  || December 3, 1999 || Reedy Creek || J. Broughton || WIT || align=right | 3.3 km || 
|-id=033 bgcolor=#d6d6d6
| 23033 ||  || — || December 5, 1999 || Catalina || CSS || — || align=right | 12 km || 
|-id=034 bgcolor=#fefefe
| 23034 ||  || — || December 5, 1999 || Višnjan Observatory || K. Korlević || NYS || align=right | 3.2 km || 
|-id=035 bgcolor=#E9E9E9
| 23035 ||  || — || December 2, 1999 || Socorro || LINEAR || — || align=right | 3.5 km || 
|-id=036 bgcolor=#fefefe
| 23036 ||  || — || December 3, 1999 || Socorro || LINEAR || — || align=right | 3.5 km || 
|-id=037 bgcolor=#fefefe
| 23037 ||  || — || December 3, 1999 || Socorro || LINEAR || NYS || align=right | 2.9 km || 
|-id=038 bgcolor=#fefefe
| 23038 Jeffbaughman ||  ||  || December 3, 1999 || Socorro || LINEAR || — || align=right | 3.4 km || 
|-id=039 bgcolor=#E9E9E9
| 23039 ||  || — || December 5, 1999 || Socorro || LINEAR || — || align=right | 5.3 km || 
|-id=040 bgcolor=#E9E9E9
| 23040 Latham ||  ||  || December 6, 1999 || Socorro || LINEAR || — || align=right | 6.4 km || 
|-id=041 bgcolor=#d6d6d6
| 23041 Hunt ||  ||  || December 6, 1999 || Socorro || LINEAR || — || align=right | 4.1 km || 
|-id=042 bgcolor=#d6d6d6
| 23042 Craigpeters ||  ||  || December 6, 1999 || Socorro || LINEAR || — || align=right | 8.5 km || 
|-id=043 bgcolor=#d6d6d6
| 23043 ||  || — || December 6, 1999 || Socorro || LINEAR || — || align=right | 6.7 km || 
|-id=044 bgcolor=#fefefe
| 23044 Starodub ||  ||  || December 6, 1999 || Socorro || LINEAR || — || align=right | 3.7 km || 
|-id=045 bgcolor=#d6d6d6
| 23045 Sarahocken ||  ||  || December 6, 1999 || Socorro || LINEAR || KOR || align=right | 4.0 km || 
|-id=046 bgcolor=#d6d6d6
| 23046 Stevengordon ||  ||  || December 6, 1999 || Socorro || LINEAR || — || align=right | 3.6 km || 
|-id=047 bgcolor=#E9E9E9
| 23047 Isseroff ||  ||  || December 6, 1999 || Socorro || LINEAR || — || align=right | 7.0 km || 
|-id=048 bgcolor=#E9E9E9
| 23048 Davidnelson ||  ||  || December 6, 1999 || Socorro || LINEAR || — || align=right | 3.5 km || 
|-id=049 bgcolor=#E9E9E9
| 23049 ||  || — || December 6, 1999 || Socorro || LINEAR || — || align=right | 7.4 km || 
|-id=050 bgcolor=#d6d6d6
| 23050 ||  || — || December 6, 1999 || Višnjan Observatory || K. Korlević || KOR || align=right | 3.5 km || 
|-id=051 bgcolor=#E9E9E9
| 23051 ||  || — || December 7, 1999 || Fountain Hills || C. W. Juels || MAR || align=right | 6.3 km || 
|-id=052 bgcolor=#E9E9E9
| 23052 ||  || — || December 7, 1999 || Fountain Hills || C. W. Juels || — || align=right | 9.5 km || 
|-id=053 bgcolor=#d6d6d6
| 23053 ||  || — || December 7, 1999 || Socorro || LINEAR || — || align=right | 9.2 km || 
|-id=054 bgcolor=#d6d6d6
| 23054 Thomaslynch ||  ||  || December 7, 1999 || Socorro || LINEAR || KAR || align=right | 3.3 km || 
|-id=055 bgcolor=#fefefe
| 23055 Barbjewett ||  ||  || December 7, 1999 || Socorro || LINEAR || — || align=right | 5.7 km || 
|-id=056 bgcolor=#d6d6d6
| 23056 ||  || — || December 7, 1999 || Socorro || LINEAR || KOR || align=right | 4.3 km || 
|-id=057 bgcolor=#E9E9E9
| 23057 Angelawilson ||  ||  || December 7, 1999 || Socorro || LINEAR || RAF || align=right | 3.1 km || 
|-id=058 bgcolor=#d6d6d6
| 23058 ||  || — || December 7, 1999 || Socorro || LINEAR || — || align=right | 12 km || 
|-id=059 bgcolor=#fefefe
| 23059 Paulpaino ||  ||  || December 7, 1999 || Socorro || LINEAR || NYS || align=right | 12 km || 
|-id=060 bgcolor=#E9E9E9
| 23060 Shepherd ||  ||  || December 7, 1999 || Socorro || LINEAR || — || align=right | 4.3 km || 
|-id=061 bgcolor=#d6d6d6
| 23061 Blueglass ||  ||  || December 7, 1999 || Socorro || LINEAR || THMslow || align=right | 8.0 km || 
|-id=062 bgcolor=#fefefe
| 23062 Donnamooney ||  ||  || December 7, 1999 || Socorro || LINEAR || MAS || align=right | 2.4 km || 
|-id=063 bgcolor=#E9E9E9
| 23063 Lichtman ||  ||  || December 7, 1999 || Socorro || LINEAR || — || align=right | 3.5 km || 
|-id=064 bgcolor=#d6d6d6
| 23064 Mattmiller ||  ||  || December 7, 1999 || Socorro || LINEAR || — || align=right | 7.2 km || 
|-id=065 bgcolor=#d6d6d6
| 23065 ||  || — || December 7, 1999 || Socorro || LINEAR || THM || align=right | 8.5 km || 
|-id=066 bgcolor=#d6d6d6
| 23066 Yihedong ||  ||  || December 7, 1999 || Socorro || LINEAR || KOR || align=right | 3.2 km || 
|-id=067 bgcolor=#d6d6d6
| 23067 Ishajain ||  ||  || December 7, 1999 || Socorro || LINEAR || THM || align=right | 7.6 km || 
|-id=068 bgcolor=#E9E9E9
| 23068 Tyagi ||  ||  || December 7, 1999 || Socorro || LINEAR || — || align=right | 3.3 km || 
|-id=069 bgcolor=#d6d6d6
| 23069 Kapps ||  ||  || December 7, 1999 || Socorro || LINEAR || — || align=right | 7.8 km || 
|-id=070 bgcolor=#d6d6d6
| 23070 Koussa ||  ||  || December 7, 1999 || Socorro || LINEAR || HYG || align=right | 8.8 km || 
|-id=071 bgcolor=#d6d6d6
| 23071 Tinaliu ||  ||  || December 7, 1999 || Socorro || LINEAR || KOR || align=right | 3.6 km || 
|-id=072 bgcolor=#d6d6d6
| 23072 ||  || — || December 7, 1999 || Socorro || LINEAR || HYG || align=right | 9.2 km || 
|-id=073 bgcolor=#d6d6d6
| 23073 ||  || — || December 7, 1999 || Socorro || LINEAR || — || align=right | 8.4 km || 
|-id=074 bgcolor=#fefefe
| 23074 Sarakirsch ||  ||  || December 7, 1999 || Socorro || LINEAR || — || align=right | 3.2 km || 
|-id=075 bgcolor=#C2FFFF
| 23075 ||  || — || December 7, 1999 || Socorro || LINEAR || L4 || align=right | 34 km || 
|-id=076 bgcolor=#d6d6d6
| 23076 ||  || — || December 7, 1999 || Socorro || LINEAR || — || align=right | 16 km || 
|-id=077 bgcolor=#E9E9E9
| 23077 ||  || — || December 7, 1999 || Socorro || LINEAR || MAR || align=right | 4.6 km || 
|-id=078 bgcolor=#d6d6d6
| 23078 ||  || — || December 7, 1999 || Catalina || CSS || — || align=right | 18 km || 
|-id=079 bgcolor=#fefefe
| 23079 Munguia ||  ||  || December 7, 1999 || Socorro || LINEAR || NYS || align=right | 6.3 km || 
|-id=080 bgcolor=#E9E9E9
| 23080 ||  || — || December 7, 1999 || Socorro || LINEAR || — || align=right | 6.6 km || 
|-id=081 bgcolor=#E9E9E9
| 23081 ||  || — || December 11, 1999 || Oaxaca || J. M. Roe || — || align=right | 3.2 km || 
|-id=082 bgcolor=#E9E9E9
| 23082 ||  || — || December 4, 1999 || Catalina || CSS || — || align=right | 3.4 km || 
|-id=083 bgcolor=#fefefe
| 23083 ||  || — || December 5, 1999 || Catalina || CSS || — || align=right | 4.9 km || 
|-id=084 bgcolor=#E9E9E9
| 23084 ||  || — || December 11, 1999 || Socorro || LINEAR || — || align=right | 3.8 km || 
|-id=085 bgcolor=#E9E9E9
| 23085 ||  || — || December 5, 1999 || Catalina || CSS || PAD || align=right | 6.4 km || 
|-id=086 bgcolor=#E9E9E9
| 23086 ||  || — || December 5, 1999 || Catalina || CSS || — || align=right | 4.7 km || 
|-id=087 bgcolor=#d6d6d6
| 23087 ||  || — || December 5, 1999 || Catalina || CSS || — || align=right | 7.1 km || 
|-id=088 bgcolor=#fefefe
| 23088 ||  || — || December 5, 1999 || Catalina || CSS || — || align=right | 3.2 km || 
|-id=089 bgcolor=#d6d6d6
| 23089 ||  || — || December 5, 1999 || Catalina || CSS || KOR || align=right | 3.3 km || 
|-id=090 bgcolor=#E9E9E9
| 23090 ||  || — || December 7, 1999 || Catalina || CSS || EUN || align=right | 7.4 km || 
|-id=091 bgcolor=#E9E9E9
| 23091 Stansill ||  ||  || December 7, 1999 || Socorro || LINEAR || — || align=right | 6.8 km || 
|-id=092 bgcolor=#E9E9E9
| 23092 ||  || — || December 14, 1999 || Fountain Hills || C. W. Juels || — || align=right | 4.2 km || 
|-id=093 bgcolor=#fefefe
| 23093 ||  || — || December 14, 1999 || Fountain Hills || C. W. Juels || — || align=right | 3.8 km || 
|-id=094 bgcolor=#E9E9E9
| 23094 ||  || — || December 15, 1999 || Fountain Hills || C. W. Juels || — || align=right | 7.9 km || 
|-id=095 bgcolor=#d6d6d6
| 23095 ||  || — || December 15, 1999 || Oohira || T. Urata || HYG || align=right | 11 km || 
|-id=096 bgcolor=#fefefe
| 23096 Mihika ||  ||  || December 8, 1999 || Socorro || LINEAR || FLO || align=right | 3.4 km || 
|-id=097 bgcolor=#E9E9E9
| 23097 ||  || — || December 8, 1999 || Socorro || LINEAR || — || align=right | 4.9 km || 
|-id=098 bgcolor=#E9E9E9
| 23098 Huanghuang ||  ||  || December 8, 1999 || Socorro || LINEAR || — || align=right | 6.3 km || 
|-id=099 bgcolor=#d6d6d6
| 23099 ||  || — || December 8, 1999 || Socorro || LINEAR || — || align=right | 29 km || 
|-id=100 bgcolor=#E9E9E9
| 23100 ||  || — || December 8, 1999 || Socorro || LINEAR || GEF || align=right | 6.3 km || 
|}

23101–23200 

|-bgcolor=#d6d6d6
| 23101 ||  || — || December 8, 1999 || Socorro || LINEAR || — || align=right | 18 km || 
|-id=102 bgcolor=#E9E9E9
| 23102 Dayanli ||  ||  || December 10, 1999 || Socorro || LINEAR || PAD || align=right | 8.1 km || 
|-id=103 bgcolor=#d6d6d6
| 23103 ||  || — || December 10, 1999 || Socorro || LINEAR || — || align=right | 13 km || 
|-id=104 bgcolor=#E9E9E9
| 23104 ||  || — || December 12, 1999 || Socorro || LINEAR || ADE || align=right | 12 km || 
|-id=105 bgcolor=#d6d6d6
| 23105 ||  || — || December 12, 1999 || Socorro || LINEAR || — || align=right | 8.8 km || 
|-id=106 bgcolor=#d6d6d6
| 23106 ||  || — || December 12, 1999 || Socorro || LINEAR || — || align=right | 17 km || 
|-id=107 bgcolor=#d6d6d6
| 23107 ||  || — || December 13, 1999 || Catalina || CSS || — || align=right | 9.1 km || 
|-id=108 bgcolor=#fefefe
| 23108 ||  || — || December 31, 1999 || Oizumi || T. Kobayashi || — || align=right | 4.9 km || 
|-id=109 bgcolor=#d6d6d6
| 23109 Masayanagisawa ||  ||  || December 30, 1999 || Anderson Mesa || LONEOS || — || align=right | 9.4 km || 
|-id=110 bgcolor=#fefefe
| 23110 Ericberne || 2000 AE ||  || January 2, 2000 || Fountain Hills || C. W. Juels || — || align=right | 4.0 km || 
|-id=111 bgcolor=#fefefe
| 23111 Fritzperls || 2000 AG ||  || January 2, 2000 || Fountain Hills || C. W. Juels || V || align=right | 3.3 km || 
|-id=112 bgcolor=#fefefe
| 23112 ||  || — || January 2, 2000 || Socorro || LINEAR || — || align=right | 3.9 km || 
|-id=113 bgcolor=#E9E9E9
| 23113 Aaronhakim ||  ||  || January 3, 2000 || Socorro || LINEAR || AGN || align=right | 3.8 km || 
|-id=114 bgcolor=#C2FFFF
| 23114 ||  || — || January 3, 2000 || Socorro || LINEAR || L4 || align=right | 21 km || 
|-id=115 bgcolor=#d6d6d6
| 23115 Valcourt ||  ||  || January 3, 2000 || Socorro || LINEAR || HYG || align=right | 6.9 km || 
|-id=116 bgcolor=#E9E9E9
| 23116 Streich ||  ||  || January 3, 2000 || Socorro || LINEAR || RAF || align=right | 3.9 km || 
|-id=117 bgcolor=#d6d6d6
| 23117 ||  || — || January 3, 2000 || Socorro || LINEAR || THM || align=right | 7.9 km || 
|-id=118 bgcolor=#C2FFFF
| 23118 ||  || — || January 3, 2000 || Socorro || LINEAR || L4 || align=right | 20 km || 
|-id=119 bgcolor=#C2FFFF
| 23119 ||  || — || January 3, 2000 || Socorro || LINEAR || L4 || align=right | 33 km || 
|-id=120 bgcolor=#E9E9E9
| 23120 Paulallen ||  ||  || January 5, 2000 || Fountain Hills || C. W. Juels || — || align=right | 11 km || 
|-id=121 bgcolor=#E9E9E9
| 23121 Michaelding ||  ||  || January 4, 2000 || Socorro || LINEAR || — || align=right | 3.4 km || 
|-id=122 bgcolor=#fefefe
| 23122 Lorgat ||  ||  || January 4, 2000 || Socorro || LINEAR || — || align=right | 3.3 km || 
|-id=123 bgcolor=#C2FFFF
| 23123 ||  || — || January 4, 2000 || Socorro || LINEAR || L4slow || align=right | 26 km || 
|-id=124 bgcolor=#E9E9E9
| 23124 ||  || — || January 5, 2000 || Socorro || LINEAR || — || align=right | 3.6 km || 
|-id=125 bgcolor=#d6d6d6
| 23125 ||  || — || January 4, 2000 || Socorro || LINEAR || EOS || align=right | 8.0 km || 
|-id=126 bgcolor=#C2FFFF
| 23126 ||  || — || January 4, 2000 || Socorro || LINEAR || L4 || align=right | 23 km || 
|-id=127 bgcolor=#fefefe
| 23127 ||  || — || January 4, 2000 || Socorro || LINEAR || — || align=right | 4.0 km || 
|-id=128 bgcolor=#fefefe
| 23128 Dorminy ||  ||  || January 5, 2000 || Socorro || LINEAR || — || align=right | 3.5 km || 
|-id=129 bgcolor=#d6d6d6
| 23129 ||  || — || January 5, 2000 || Socorro || LINEAR || — || align=right | 20 km || 
|-id=130 bgcolor=#E9E9E9
| 23130 ||  || — || January 5, 2000 || Socorro || LINEAR || — || align=right | 5.0 km || 
|-id=131 bgcolor=#fefefe
| 23131 Debenedictis ||  ||  || January 5, 2000 || Socorro || LINEAR || — || align=right | 3.9 km || 
|-id=132 bgcolor=#d6d6d6
| 23132 ||  || — || January 3, 2000 || Socorro || LINEAR || HYG || align=right | 8.8 km || 
|-id=133 bgcolor=#fefefe
| 23133 Rishinbehl ||  ||  || January 5, 2000 || Socorro || LINEAR || V || align=right | 2.4 km || 
|-id=134 bgcolor=#d6d6d6
| 23134 ||  || — || January 5, 2000 || Socorro || LINEAR || — || align=right | 11 km || 
|-id=135 bgcolor=#C2FFFF
| 23135 Pheidas ||  ||  || January 7, 2000 || Socorro || LINEAR || L4 || align=right | 66 km || 
|-id=136 bgcolor=#d6d6d6
| 23136 ||  || — || January 5, 2000 || Socorro || LINEAR || — || align=right | 8.1 km || 
|-id=137 bgcolor=#d6d6d6
| 23137 ||  || — || January 7, 2000 || Socorro || LINEAR || — || align=right | 11 km || 
|-id=138 bgcolor=#d6d6d6
| 23138 ||  || — || January 8, 2000 || Socorro || LINEAR || — || align=right | 9.8 km || 
|-id=139 bgcolor=#fefefe
| 23139 ||  || — || January 8, 2000 || Socorro || LINEAR || — || align=right | 3.3 km || 
|-id=140 bgcolor=#d6d6d6
| 23140 ||  || — || January 3, 2000 || Socorro || LINEAR || — || align=right | 13 km || 
|-id=141 bgcolor=#d6d6d6
| 23141 ||  || — || January 5, 2000 || Socorro || LINEAR || EOS || align=right | 8.8 km || 
|-id=142 bgcolor=#d6d6d6
| 23142 ||  || — || January 8, 2000 || Socorro || LINEAR || — || align=right | 13 km || 
|-id=143 bgcolor=#E9E9E9
| 23143 ||  || — || January 7, 2000 || Socorro || LINEAR || — || align=right | 12 km || 
|-id=144 bgcolor=#C2FFFF
| 23144 ||  || — || January 7, 2000 || Socorro || LINEAR || L4 || align=right | 19 km || 
|-id=145 bgcolor=#fefefe
| 23145 ||  || — || January 8, 2000 || Socorro || LINEAR || — || align=right | 5.5 km || 
|-id=146 bgcolor=#d6d6d6
| 23146 ||  || — || January 9, 2000 || Socorro || LINEAR || INA || align=right | 9.8 km || 
|-id=147 bgcolor=#fefefe
| 23147 ||  || — || January 5, 2000 || Socorro || LINEAR || — || align=right | 4.4 km || 
|-id=148 bgcolor=#E9E9E9
| 23148 ||  || — || January 7, 2000 || Socorro || LINEAR || CLO || align=right | 6.1 km || 
|-id=149 bgcolor=#E9E9E9
| 23149 ||  || — || January 8, 2000 || Socorro || LINEAR || — || align=right | 7.4 km || 
|-id=150 bgcolor=#d6d6d6
| 23150 ||  || — || January 8, 2000 || Socorro || LINEAR || ALA || align=right | 11 km || 
|-id=151 bgcolor=#d6d6d6
| 23151 Georgehotz ||  ||  || January 30, 2000 || Socorro || LINEAR || KOR || align=right | 3.5 km || 
|-id=152 bgcolor=#C2FFFF
| 23152 ||  || — || February 2, 2000 || Socorro || LINEAR || L4 || align=right | 19 km || 
|-id=153 bgcolor=#fefefe
| 23153 Andrewnowell ||  ||  || February 2, 2000 || Socorro || LINEAR || FLO || align=right | 4.5 km || 
|-id=154 bgcolor=#E9E9E9
| 23154 ||  || — || February 5, 2000 || Socorro || LINEAR || EUN || align=right | 5.1 km || 
|-id=155 bgcolor=#fefefe
| 23155 Judithblack ||  ||  || February 4, 2000 || Socorro || LINEAR || FLO || align=right | 3.7 km || 
|-id=156 bgcolor=#fefefe
| 23156 ||  || — || February 28, 2000 || Višnjan Observatory || K. Korlević, M. Jurić || — || align=right | 2.4 km || 
|-id=157 bgcolor=#d6d6d6
| 23157 ||  || — || February 29, 2000 || Socorro || LINEAR || THM || align=right | 10 km || 
|-id=158 bgcolor=#fefefe
| 23158 Bouligny ||  ||  || February 29, 2000 || Socorro || LINEAR || — || align=right | 4.0 km || 
|-id=159 bgcolor=#d6d6d6
| 23159 ||  || — || March 8, 2000 || Socorro || LINEAR || — || align=right | 9.3 km || 
|-id=160 bgcolor=#E9E9E9
| 23160 ||  || — || March 13, 2000 || Socorro || LINEAR || HNS || align=right | 8.3 km || 
|-id=161 bgcolor=#d6d6d6
| 23161 ||  || — || March 28, 2000 || Socorro || LINEAR || EOS || align=right | 7.0 km || 
|-id=162 bgcolor=#fefefe
| 23162 Alexcrook ||  ||  || March 30, 2000 || Socorro || LINEAR || NYS || align=right | 2.6 km || 
|-id=163 bgcolor=#fefefe
| 23163 ||  || — || March 30, 2000 || Socorro || LINEAR || NYS || align=right | 2.4 km || 
|-id=164 bgcolor=#d6d6d6
| 23164 Badger ||  ||  || April 5, 2000 || Socorro || LINEAR || — || align=right | 6.3 km || 
|-id=165 bgcolor=#E9E9E9
| 23165 Kakinchan ||  ||  || April 6, 2000 || Socorro || LINEAR || — || align=right | 4.1 km || 
|-id=166 bgcolor=#E9E9E9
| 23166 Bilal ||  ||  || April 7, 2000 || Socorro || LINEAR || — || align=right | 9.2 km || 
|-id=167 bgcolor=#E9E9E9
| 23167 ||  || — || April 7, 2000 || Socorro || LINEAR || — || align=right | 11 km || 
|-id=168 bgcolor=#fefefe
| 23168 Lauriefletch ||  ||  || April 12, 2000 || Socorro || LINEAR || — || align=right | 3.1 km || 
|-id=169 bgcolor=#fefefe
| 23169 Michikami ||  ||  || April 5, 2000 || Anderson Mesa || LONEOS || — || align=right | 4.0 km || 
|-id=170 bgcolor=#E9E9E9
| 23170 ||  || — || April 4, 2000 || Socorro || LINEAR || EUN || align=right | 3.6 km || 
|-id=171 bgcolor=#E9E9E9
| 23171 ||  || — || April 27, 2000 || Socorro || LINEAR || AGN || align=right | 5.1 km || 
|-id=172 bgcolor=#fefefe
| 23172 Williamartin ||  ||  || April 29, 2000 || Socorro || LINEAR || — || align=right | 2.1 km || 
|-id=173 bgcolor=#E9E9E9
| 23173 Hideaki ||  ||  || April 24, 2000 || Anderson Mesa || LONEOS || — || align=right | 4.2 km || 
|-id=174 bgcolor=#d6d6d6
| 23174 ||  || — || April 30, 2000 || Kitt Peak || Spacewatch || 3:2 || align=right | 24 km || 
|-id=175 bgcolor=#fefefe
| 23175 ||  || — || April 27, 2000 || Socorro || LINEAR || V || align=right | 3.3 km || 
|-id=176 bgcolor=#E9E9E9
| 23176 Missacarvell ||  ||  || May 7, 2000 || Socorro || LINEAR || — || align=right | 3.3 km || 
|-id=177 bgcolor=#fefefe
| 23177 ||  || — || May 6, 2000 || Socorro || LINEAR || V || align=right | 4.6 km || 
|-id=178 bgcolor=#fefefe
| 23178 Ghaben ||  ||  || May 28, 2000 || Socorro || LINEAR || FLO || align=right | 1.7 km || 
|-id=179 bgcolor=#fefefe
| 23179 Niedermeyer ||  ||  || May 28, 2000 || Socorro || LINEAR || FLO || align=right | 4.1 km || 
|-id=180 bgcolor=#fefefe
| 23180 Ryosuke ||  ||  || May 28, 2000 || Anderson Mesa || LONEOS || — || align=right | 7.6 km || 
|-id=181 bgcolor=#fefefe
| 23181 ||  || — || June 8, 2000 || Socorro || LINEAR || — || align=right | 2.4 km || 
|-id=182 bgcolor=#E9E9E9
| 23182 Siyaxuza ||  ||  || July 23, 2000 || Socorro || LINEAR || — || align=right | 2.5 km || 
|-id=183 bgcolor=#FFC2E0
| 23183 ||  || — || July 28, 2000 || Siding Spring || R. H. McNaught || AMO +1km || align=right | 1.1 km || 
|-id=184 bgcolor=#fefefe
| 23184 ||  || — || July 23, 2000 || Socorro || LINEAR || — || align=right | 9.0 km || 
|-id=185 bgcolor=#d6d6d6
| 23185 ||  || — || August 2, 2000 || Socorro || LINEAR || — || align=right | 6.7 km || 
|-id=186 bgcolor=#d6d6d6
| 23186 ||  || — || August 6, 2000 || Needville || W. G. Dillon || 3:2 || align=right | 28 km || 
|-id=187 bgcolor=#FFC2E0
| 23187 ||  || — || August 8, 2000 || Socorro || LINEAR || APO +1kmPHA || align=right | 2.2 km || 
|-id=188 bgcolor=#E9E9E9
| 23188 ||  || — || August 1, 2000 || Socorro || LINEAR || — || align=right | 7.9 km || 
|-id=189 bgcolor=#d6d6d6
| 23189 ||  || — || August 2, 2000 || Socorro || LINEAR || THM || align=right | 7.4 km || 
|-id=190 bgcolor=#E9E9E9
| 23190 Klages-Mundt ||  ||  || August 24, 2000 || Socorro || LINEAR || — || align=right | 2.8 km || 
|-id=191 bgcolor=#d6d6d6
| 23191 Sujaytyle ||  ||  || August 24, 2000 || Socorro || LINEAR || — || align=right | 7.7 km || 
|-id=192 bgcolor=#d6d6d6
| 23192 Caysvesterby ||  ||  || August 25, 2000 || Socorro || LINEAR || EOS || align=right | 6.5 km || 
|-id=193 bgcolor=#fefefe
| 23193 ||  || — || August 31, 2000 || Socorro || LINEAR || — || align=right | 4.3 km || 
|-id=194 bgcolor=#fefefe
| 23194 ||  || — || September 1, 2000 || Socorro || LINEAR || — || align=right | 3.4 km || 
|-id=195 bgcolor=#d6d6d6
| 23195 ||  || — || September 7, 2000 || Kitt Peak || Spacewatch || — || align=right | 10 km || 
|-id=196 bgcolor=#d6d6d6
| 23196 ||  || — || September 5, 2000 || Višnjan Observatory || K. Korlević || — || align=right | 12 km || 
|-id=197 bgcolor=#fefefe
| 23197 Danielcook ||  ||  || September 1, 2000 || Socorro || LINEAR || NYS || align=right | 4.0 km || 
|-id=198 bgcolor=#d6d6d6
| 23198 Norvell ||  ||  || September 2, 2000 || Socorro || LINEAR || KOR || align=right | 4.8 km || 
|-id=199 bgcolor=#d6d6d6
| 23199 Bezdek ||  ||  || September 3, 2000 || Socorro || LINEAR || — || align=right | 4.1 km || 
|-id=200 bgcolor=#fefefe
| 23200 ||  || — || September 20, 2000 || Socorro || LINEAR || PHO || align=right | 6.7 km || 
|}

23201–23300 

|-bgcolor=#fefefe
| 23201 ||  || — || September 27, 2000 || Zeno || T. Stafford || — || align=right | 3.7 km || 
|-id=202 bgcolor=#d6d6d6
| 23202 ||  || — || September 23, 2000 || Socorro || LINEAR || — || align=right | 9.4 km || 
|-id=203 bgcolor=#E9E9E9
| 23203 ||  || — || September 20, 2000 || Haleakala || NEAT || — || align=right | 5.2 km || 
|-id=204 bgcolor=#fefefe
| 23204 Arditkroni ||  ||  || September 27, 2000 || Socorro || LINEAR || V || align=right | 3.7 km || 
|-id=205 bgcolor=#E9E9E9
| 23205 ||  || — || September 26, 2000 || Socorro || LINEAR || — || align=right | 4.6 km || 
|-id=206 bgcolor=#E9E9E9
| 23206 ||  || — || September 27, 2000 || Socorro || LINEAR || GEF || align=right | 4.8 km || 
|-id=207 bgcolor=#d6d6d6
| 23207 ||  || — || September 30, 2000 || Socorro || LINEAR || — || align=right | 6.6 km || 
|-id=208 bgcolor=#d6d6d6
| 23208 ||  || — || September 25, 2000 || Socorro || LINEAR || — || align=right | 5.3 km || 
|-id=209 bgcolor=#d6d6d6
| 23209 ||  || — || September 25, 2000 || Socorro || LINEAR || — || align=right | 9.4 km || 
|-id=210 bgcolor=#d6d6d6
| 23210 ||  || — || September 27, 2000 || Socorro || LINEAR || — || align=right | 9.2 km || 
|-id=211 bgcolor=#E9E9E9
| 23211 ||  || — || September 26, 2000 || Socorro || LINEAR || — || align=right | 4.5 km || 
|-id=212 bgcolor=#d6d6d6
| 23212 Arkajitdey ||  ||  || October 24, 2000 || Socorro || LINEAR || — || align=right | 6.7 km || 
|-id=213 bgcolor=#E9E9E9
| 23213 Ameliachang ||  ||  || October 25, 2000 || Socorro || LINEAR || — || align=right | 5.5 km || 
|-id=214 bgcolor=#E9E9E9
| 23214 Patrickchen ||  ||  || October 26, 2000 || Socorro || LINEAR || HEN || align=right | 3.5 km || 
|-id=215 bgcolor=#fefefe
| 23215 ||  || — || October 31, 2000 || Socorro || LINEAR || — || align=right | 5.0 km || 
|-id=216 bgcolor=#E9E9E9
| 23216 Mikehagler ||  ||  || October 24, 2000 || Socorro || LINEAR || — || align=right | 3.7 km || 
|-id=217 bgcolor=#fefefe
| 23217 Nayana ||  ||  || October 25, 2000 || Socorro || LINEAR || FLO || align=right | 3.6 km || 
|-id=218 bgcolor=#d6d6d6
| 23218 Puttachi ||  ||  || November 1, 2000 || Socorro || LINEAR || KOR || align=right | 4.4 km || 
|-id=219 bgcolor=#E9E9E9
| 23219 ||  || — || November 1, 2000 || Socorro || LINEAR || — || align=right | 5.4 km || 
|-id=220 bgcolor=#E9E9E9
| 23220 Yalemichaels ||  ||  || November 1, 2000 || Socorro || LINEAR || — || align=right | 3.1 km || 
|-id=221 bgcolor=#fefefe
| 23221 Delgado ||  ||  || November 1, 2000 || Socorro || LINEAR || — || align=right | 3.4 km || 
|-id=222 bgcolor=#E9E9E9
| 23222 ||  || — || November 3, 2000 || Socorro || LINEAR || — || align=right | 5.4 km || 
|-id=223 bgcolor=#E9E9E9
| 23223 || 2000 WA || — || November 16, 2000 || Kitt Peak || Spacewatch || — || align=right | 7.3 km || 
|-id=224 bgcolor=#E9E9E9
| 23224 ||  || — || November 22, 2000 || Kitt Peak || Spacewatch || — || align=right | 6.1 km || 
|-id=225 bgcolor=#fefefe
| 23225 ||  || — || November 20, 2000 || Socorro || LINEAR || — || align=right | 6.8 km || 
|-id=226 bgcolor=#fefefe
| 23226 ||  || — || November 21, 2000 || Socorro || LINEAR || NYS || align=right | 2.4 km || 
|-id=227 bgcolor=#d6d6d6
| 23227 ||  || — || November 20, 2000 || Socorro || LINEAR || — || align=right | 12 km || 
|-id=228 bgcolor=#fefefe
| 23228 Nandinisarma ||  ||  || November 21, 2000 || Socorro || LINEAR || V || align=right | 2.3 km || 
|-id=229 bgcolor=#E9E9E9
| 23229 ||  || — || November 21, 2000 || Socorro || LINEAR || — || align=right | 4.1 km || 
|-id=230 bgcolor=#fefefe
| 23230 ||  || — || November 21, 2000 || Socorro || LINEAR || NYS || align=right | 6.2 km || 
|-id=231 bgcolor=#fefefe
| 23231 ||  || — || November 21, 2000 || Socorro || LINEAR || V || align=right | 5.6 km || 
|-id=232 bgcolor=#fefefe
| 23232 Buschur ||  ||  || November 21, 2000 || Socorro || LINEAR || — || align=right | 9.1 km || 
|-id=233 bgcolor=#fefefe
| 23233 ||  || — || November 19, 2000 || Socorro || LINEAR || PHO || align=right | 4.5 km || 
|-id=234 bgcolor=#fefefe
| 23234 Lilliantsai ||  ||  || November 20, 2000 || Socorro || LINEAR || V || align=right | 2.4 km || 
|-id=235 bgcolor=#E9E9E9
| 23235 Yingfan ||  ||  || November 21, 2000 || Socorro || LINEAR || — || align=right | 3.2 km || 
|-id=236 bgcolor=#E9E9E9
| 23236 ||  || — || November 21, 2000 || Socorro || LINEAR || — || align=right | 8.8 km || 
|-id=237 bgcolor=#E9E9E9
| 23237 ||  || — || November 24, 2000 || Kitt Peak || Spacewatch || — || align=right | 4.6 km || 
|-id=238 bgcolor=#fefefe
| 23238 Ocasio-Cortez ||  ||  || November 20, 2000 || Socorro || LINEAR || V || align=right | 2.3 km || 
|-id=239 bgcolor=#E9E9E9
| 23239 ||  || — || November 20, 2000 || Socorro || LINEAR || — || align=right | 3.3 km || 
|-id=240 bgcolor=#fefefe
| 23240 ||  || — || November 20, 2000 || Socorro || LINEAR || — || align=right | 3.2 km || 
|-id=241 bgcolor=#E9E9E9
| 23241 Yada ||  ||  || November 20, 2000 || Anderson Mesa || LONEOS || — || align=right | 3.0 km || 
|-id=242 bgcolor=#E9E9E9
| 23242 ||  || — || November 21, 2000 || Socorro || LINEAR || — || align=right | 7.9 km || 
|-id=243 bgcolor=#E9E9E9
| 23243 ||  || — || November 22, 2000 || Haleakala || NEAT || — || align=right | 8.5 km || 
|-id=244 bgcolor=#E9E9E9
| 23244 Lafayette ||  ||  || November 20, 2000 || Anderson Mesa || LONEOS || — || align=right | 3.4 km || 
|-id=245 bgcolor=#fefefe
| 23245 Fujimura ||  ||  || November 25, 2000 || Anderson Mesa || LONEOS || — || align=right | 2.1 km || 
|-id=246 bgcolor=#E9E9E9
| 23246 Terazono ||  ||  || November 25, 2000 || Anderson Mesa || LONEOS || RAF || align=right | 3.4 km || 
|-id=247 bgcolor=#d6d6d6
| 23247 ||  || — || November 26, 2000 || Socorro || LINEAR || — || align=right | 7.2 km || 
|-id=248 bgcolor=#E9E9E9
| 23248 Batchelor ||  ||  || November 25, 2000 || Socorro || LINEAR || — || align=right | 6.3 km || 
|-id=249 bgcolor=#fefefe
| 23249 Liaoyenting ||  ||  || November 26, 2000 || Socorro || LINEAR || V || align=right | 1.9 km || 
|-id=250 bgcolor=#FA8072
| 23250 ||  || — || November 22, 2000 || Haleakala || NEAT || — || align=right | 2.1 km || 
|-id=251 bgcolor=#E9E9E9
| 23251 ||  || — || December 1, 2000 || Socorro || LINEAR || — || align=right | 8.7 km || 
|-id=252 bgcolor=#fefefe
| 23252 ||  || — || December 1, 2000 || Socorro || LINEAR || — || align=right | 2.7 km || 
|-id=253 bgcolor=#E9E9E9
| 23253 ||  || — || December 19, 2000 || Haleakala || NEAT || — || align=right | 4.2 km || 
|-id=254 bgcolor=#E9E9E9
| 23254 Chikatoshi ||  ||  || December 22, 2000 || Anderson Mesa || LONEOS || — || align=right | 9.0 km || 
|-id=255 bgcolor=#E9E9E9
| 23255 ||  || — || December 22, 2000 || Socorro || LINEAR || BRU || align=right | 9.7 km || 
|-id=256 bgcolor=#fefefe
| 23256 ||  || — || December 28, 2000 || Fountain Hills || C. W. Juels || MAS || align=right | 2.7 km || 
|-id=257 bgcolor=#E9E9E9
| 23257 Denny ||  ||  || December 29, 2000 || Desert Beaver || W. K. Y. Yeung || — || align=right | 6.0 km || 
|-id=258 bgcolor=#fefefe
| 23258 Tsuihark ||  ||  || December 29, 2000 || Desert Beaver || W. K. Y. Yeung || — || align=right | 3.4 km || 
|-id=259 bgcolor=#fefefe
| 23259 Miwadagakuen ||  ||  || December 29, 2000 || Bisei SG Center || BATTeRS || — || align=right | 3.3 km || 
|-id=260 bgcolor=#fefefe
| 23260 ||  || — || December 28, 2000 || Socorro || LINEAR || FLO || align=right | 3.4 km || 
|-id=261 bgcolor=#E9E9E9
| 23261 ||  || — || December 30, 2000 || Socorro || LINEAR || — || align=right | 4.0 km || 
|-id=262 bgcolor=#fefefe
| 23262 Thiagoolson ||  ||  || December 30, 2000 || Socorro || LINEAR || — || align=right | 3.0 km || 
|-id=263 bgcolor=#E9E9E9
| 23263 ||  || — || December 30, 2000 || Socorro || LINEAR || MAR || align=right | 3.9 km || 
|-id=264 bgcolor=#E9E9E9
| 23264 ||  || — || December 30, 2000 || Socorro || LINEAR || — || align=right | 3.1 km || 
|-id=265 bgcolor=#E9E9E9
| 23265 von Wurden ||  ||  || December 30, 2000 || Socorro || LINEAR || — || align=right | 2.8 km || 
|-id=266 bgcolor=#fefefe
| 23266 ||  || — || December 30, 2000 || Socorro || LINEAR || NYS || align=right | 2.8 km || 
|-id=267 bgcolor=#E9E9E9
| 23267 ||  || — || December 30, 2000 || Socorro || LINEAR || — || align=right | 3.0 km || 
|-id=268 bgcolor=#fefefe
| 23268 ||  || — || December 30, 2000 || Socorro || LINEAR || FLO || align=right | 3.8 km || 
|-id=269 bgcolor=#C2FFFF
| 23269 ||  || — || December 30, 2000 || Socorro || LINEAR || L4 || align=right | 24 km || 
|-id=270 bgcolor=#fefefe
| 23270 Kellerman ||  ||  || December 30, 2000 || Socorro || LINEAR || NYS || align=right | 5.5 km || 
|-id=271 bgcolor=#fefefe
| 23271 Kellychacon ||  ||  || December 28, 2000 || Socorro || LINEAR || V || align=right | 1.8 km || 
|-id=272 bgcolor=#fefefe
| 23272 ||  || — || December 28, 2000 || Socorro || LINEAR || — || align=right | 3.2 km || 
|-id=273 bgcolor=#d6d6d6
| 23273 ||  || — || December 30, 2000 || Socorro || LINEAR || — || align=right | 10 km || 
|-id=274 bgcolor=#d6d6d6
| 23274 Wuminchun ||  ||  || December 30, 2000 || Socorro || LINEAR || EOS || align=right | 4.6 km || 
|-id=275 bgcolor=#d6d6d6
| 23275 ||  || — || December 28, 2000 || Socorro || LINEAR || — || align=right | 11 km || 
|-id=276 bgcolor=#fefefe
| 23276 ||  || — || December 28, 2000 || Socorro || LINEAR || — || align=right | 6.0 km || 
|-id=277 bgcolor=#fefefe
| 23277 Benhughes ||  ||  || December 28, 2000 || Socorro || LINEAR || — || align=right | 2.4 km || 
|-id=278 bgcolor=#d6d6d6
| 23278 ||  || — || December 28, 2000 || Socorro || LINEAR || — || align=right | 7.1 km || 
|-id=279 bgcolor=#fefefe
| 23279 Chenhungjen ||  ||  || December 30, 2000 || Socorro || LINEAR || — || align=right | 2.6 km || 
|-id=280 bgcolor=#fefefe
| 23280 Laitsaita ||  ||  || December 30, 2000 || Socorro || LINEAR || — || align=right | 3.6 km || 
|-id=281 bgcolor=#fefefe
| 23281 Vijayjain ||  ||  || December 30, 2000 || Socorro || LINEAR || FLO || align=right | 2.1 km || 
|-id=282 bgcolor=#fefefe
| 23282 ||  || — || December 30, 2000 || Socorro || LINEAR || FLO || align=right | 3.1 km || 
|-id=283 bgcolor=#fefefe
| 23283 Jinjuyi ||  ||  || December 30, 2000 || Socorro || LINEAR || — || align=right | 2.1 km || 
|-id=284 bgcolor=#fefefe
| 23284 Celik ||  ||  || December 30, 2000 || Socorro || LINEAR || NYS || align=right | 2.1 km || 
|-id=285 bgcolor=#C2FFFF
| 23285 ||  || — || December 29, 2000 || Anderson Mesa || LONEOS || L4 || align=right | 30 km || 
|-id=286 bgcolor=#E9E9E9
| 23286 Parlakgul ||  ||  || December 19, 2000 || Socorro || LINEAR || — || align=right | 4.5 km || 
|-id=287 bgcolor=#E9E9E9
| 23287 ||  || — || December 19, 2000 || Socorro || LINEAR || GEF || align=right | 4.0 km || 
|-id=288 bgcolor=#E9E9E9
| 23288 ||  || — || December 28, 2000 || Socorro || LINEAR || — || align=right | 3.8 km || 
|-id=289 bgcolor=#fefefe
| 23289 Naruhirata ||  ||  || December 29, 2000 || Anderson Mesa || LONEOS || FLO || align=right | 2.5 km || 
|-id=290 bgcolor=#E9E9E9
| 23290 ||  || — || December 29, 2000 || Haleakala || NEAT || — || align=right | 4.7 km || 
|-id=291 bgcolor=#fefefe
| 23291 ||  || — || December 29, 2000 || Haleakala || NEAT || — || align=right | 2.0 km || 
|-id=292 bgcolor=#fefefe
| 23292 ||  || — || December 29, 2000 || Haleakala || NEAT || — || align=right | 3.7 km || 
|-id=293 bgcolor=#fefefe
| 23293 ||  || — || December 30, 2000 || Socorro || LINEAR || FLO || align=right | 2.8 km || 
|-id=294 bgcolor=#fefefe
| 23294 Sunao ||  ||  || December 23, 2000 || Anderson Mesa || LONEOS || ERI || align=right | 6.8 km || 
|-id=295 bgcolor=#fefefe
| 23295 Brandoreavis ||  ||  || December 23, 2000 || Socorro || LINEAR || — || align=right | 2.4 km || 
|-id=296 bgcolor=#fefefe
| 23296 Brianreavis ||  ||  || January 2, 2001 || Socorro || LINEAR || FLO || align=right | 3.4 km || 
|-id=297 bgcolor=#fefefe
| 23297 ||  || — || January 2, 2001 || Socorro || LINEAR || FLO || align=right | 3.5 km || 
|-id=298 bgcolor=#fefefe
| 23298 Loewenstein ||  ||  || January 2, 2001 || Socorro || LINEAR || FLO || align=right | 2.7 km || 
|-id=299 bgcolor=#E9E9E9
| 23299 ||  || — || January 2, 2001 || Socorro || LINEAR || — || align=right | 2.8 km || 
|-id=300 bgcolor=#fefefe
| 23300 ||  || — || January 2, 2001 || Socorro || LINEAR || PHO || align=right | 3.9 km || 
|}

23301–23400 

|-bgcolor=#d6d6d6
| 23301 ||  || — || January 2, 2001 || Socorro || LINEAR || Tj (2.9) || align=right | 27 km || 
|-id=302 bgcolor=#E9E9E9
| 23302 ||  || — || January 2, 2001 || Socorro || LINEAR || EUN || align=right | 4.7 km || 
|-id=303 bgcolor=#E9E9E9
| 23303 ||  || — || January 2, 2001 || Socorro || LINEAR || EUN || align=right | 6.9 km || 
|-id=304 bgcolor=#E9E9E9
| 23304 ||  || — || January 2, 2001 || Socorro || LINEAR || — || align=right | 7.4 km || 
|-id=305 bgcolor=#d6d6d6
| 23305 ||  || — || January 2, 2001 || Socorro || LINEAR || — || align=right | 11 km || 
|-id=306 bgcolor=#fefefe
| 23306 Adamfields ||  ||  || January 2, 2001 || Socorro || LINEAR || V || align=right | 3.4 km || 
|-id=307 bgcolor=#fefefe
| 23307 Alexramek ||  ||  || January 2, 2001 || Socorro || LINEAR || V || align=right | 1.8 km || 
|-id=308 bgcolor=#E9E9E9
| 23308 Niyomsatian ||  ||  || January 3, 2001 || Socorro || LINEAR || — || align=right | 5.7 km || 
|-id=309 bgcolor=#d6d6d6
| 23309 ||  || — || January 3, 2001 || Socorro || LINEAR || EOS || align=right | 5.2 km || 
|-id=310 bgcolor=#fefefe
| 23310 Siriwon ||  ||  || January 4, 2001 || Socorro || LINEAR || FLO || align=right | 2.0 km || 
|-id=311 bgcolor=#E9E9E9
| 23311 ||  || — || January 4, 2001 || Socorro || LINEAR || MAR || align=right | 5.8 km || 
|-id=312 bgcolor=#fefefe
| 23312 ||  || — || January 3, 2001 || Socorro || LINEAR || — || align=right | 2.5 km || 
|-id=313 bgcolor=#fefefe
| 23313 Supokaivanich ||  ||  || January 3, 2001 || Socorro || LINEAR || FLO || align=right | 2.3 km || 
|-id=314 bgcolor=#E9E9E9
| 23314 ||  || — || January 15, 2001 || Oizumi || T. Kobayashi || EUN || align=right | 3.4 km || 
|-id=315 bgcolor=#d6d6d6
| 23315 Navinbrian ||  ||  || January 19, 2001 || Socorro || LINEAR || — || align=right | 8.8 km || 
|-id=316 bgcolor=#E9E9E9
| 23316 ||  || — || January 19, 2001 || Socorro || LINEAR || BRU || align=right | 7.9 km || 
|-id=317 bgcolor=#fefefe
| 23317 ||  || — || January 21, 2001 || Socorro || LINEAR || — || align=right | 2.6 km || 
|-id=318 bgcolor=#d6d6d6
| 23318 Salvadorsanchez ||  ||  || January 20, 2001 || Ametlla de Mar || J. Nomen || — || align=right | 18 km || 
|-id=319 bgcolor=#fefefe
| 23319 ||  || — || January 21, 2001 || Oizumi || T. Kobayashi || — || align=right | 5.4 km || 
|-id=320 bgcolor=#fefefe
| 23320 ||  || — || January 21, 2001 || Oizumi || T. Kobayashi || — || align=right | 1.8 km || 
|-id=321 bgcolor=#E9E9E9
| 23321 ||  || — || January 18, 2001 || Socorro || LINEAR || — || align=right | 4.2 km || 
|-id=322 bgcolor=#E9E9E9
| 23322 Duyingsewa ||  ||  || January 20, 2001 || Socorro || LINEAR || — || align=right | 2.9 km || 
|-id=323 bgcolor=#d6d6d6
| 23323 Anand ||  ||  || January 20, 2001 || Socorro || LINEAR || — || align=right | 7.4 km || 
|-id=324 bgcolor=#E9E9E9
| 23324 Kwak ||  ||  || January 20, 2001 || Socorro || LINEAR || — || align=right | 2.9 km || 
|-id=325 bgcolor=#fefefe
| 23325 Arroyo ||  ||  || January 20, 2001 || Socorro || LINEAR || — || align=right | 2.1 km || 
|-id=326 bgcolor=#d6d6d6
| 23326 ||  || — || January 20, 2001 || Socorro || LINEAR || — || align=right | 10 km || 
|-id=327 bgcolor=#fefefe
| 23327 Luchernandez ||  ||  || January 20, 2001 || Socorro || LINEAR || FLO || align=right | 2.5 km || 
|-id=328 bgcolor=#d6d6d6
| 23328 ||  || — || January 20, 2001 || Socorro || LINEAR || EOS || align=right | 13 km || 
|-id=329 bgcolor=#fefefe
| 23329 Josevega ||  ||  || January 19, 2001 || Socorro || LINEAR || V || align=right | 1.5 km || 
|-id=330 bgcolor=#fefefe
| 23330 ||  || — || January 19, 2001 || Socorro || LINEAR || — || align=right | 2.1 km || 
|-id=331 bgcolor=#fefefe
| 23331 Halimzeidan ||  ||  || January 19, 2001 || Socorro || LINEAR || — || align=right | 2.8 km || 
|-id=332 bgcolor=#fefefe
| 23332 ||  || — || January 18, 2001 || Kitt Peak || Spacewatch || — || align=right | 1.8 km || 
|-id=333 bgcolor=#fefefe
| 23333 || 2059 P-L || — || September 24, 1960 || Palomar || PLS || — || align=right | 2.7 km || 
|-id=334 bgcolor=#fefefe
| 23334 || 2508 P-L || — || September 24, 1960 || Palomar || PLS || — || align=right | 2.1 km || 
|-id=335 bgcolor=#fefefe
| 23335 || 2542 P-L || — || September 24, 1960 || Palomar || PLS || NYS || align=right | 2.3 km || 
|-id=336 bgcolor=#fefefe
| 23336 || 2579 P-L || — || September 24, 1960 || Palomar || PLS || — || align=right | 3.5 km || 
|-id=337 bgcolor=#d6d6d6
| 23337 || 2613 P-L || — || September 24, 1960 || Palomar || PLS || HYG || align=right | 6.1 km || 
|-id=338 bgcolor=#d6d6d6
| 23338 || 2809 P-L || — || September 24, 1960 || Palomar || PLS || KAR || align=right | 2.9 km || 
|-id=339 bgcolor=#E9E9E9
| 23339 || 3025 P-L || — || September 24, 1960 || Palomar || PLS || — || align=right | 7.1 km || 
|-id=340 bgcolor=#E9E9E9
| 23340 || 3092 P-L || — || September 24, 1960 || Palomar || PLS || — || align=right | 4.3 km || 
|-id=341 bgcolor=#E9E9E9
| 23341 || 3503 P-L || — || October 17, 1960 || Palomar || PLS || — || align=right | 5.5 km || 
|-id=342 bgcolor=#E9E9E9
| 23342 || 4086 P-L || — || September 24, 1960 || Palomar || PLS || — || align=right | 2.6 km || 
|-id=343 bgcolor=#E9E9E9
| 23343 || 4238 P-L || — || September 24, 1960 || Palomar || PLS || JUN || align=right | 2.0 km || 
|-id=344 bgcolor=#fefefe
| 23344 || 4612 P-L || — || September 24, 1960 || Palomar || PLS || EUT || align=right | 2.4 km || 
|-id=345 bgcolor=#fefefe
| 23345 || 4619 P-L || — || September 24, 1960 || Palomar || PLS || — || align=right | 2.1 km || 
|-id=346 bgcolor=#fefefe
| 23346 || 4695 P-L || — || September 24, 1960 || Palomar || PLS || V || align=right | 2.0 km || 
|-id=347 bgcolor=#fefefe
| 23347 || 5567 P-L || — || October 17, 1960 || Palomar || PLS || — || align=right | 2.9 km || 
|-id=348 bgcolor=#E9E9E9
| 23348 || 6046 P-L || — || September 24, 1960 || Palomar || PLS || ADE || align=right | 6.8 km || 
|-id=349 bgcolor=#E9E9E9
| 23349 || 6741 P-L || — || September 24, 1960 || Palomar || PLS || — || align=right | 2.8 km || 
|-id=350 bgcolor=#E9E9E9
| 23350 || 6779 P-L || — || September 24, 1960 || Palomar || PLS || — || align=right | 3.2 km || 
|-id=351 bgcolor=#E9E9E9
| 23351 || 6818 P-L || — || September 24, 1960 || Palomar || PLS || MIS || align=right | 7.1 km || 
|-id=352 bgcolor=#fefefe
| 23352 || 7585 P-L || — || October 17, 1960 || Palomar || PLS || — || align=right | 2.3 km || 
|-id=353 bgcolor=#fefefe
| 23353 || 9518 P-L || — || October 17, 1960 || Palomar || PLS || NYS || align=right | 3.3 km || 
|-id=354 bgcolor=#fefefe
| 23354 || 9547 P-L || — || October 17, 1960 || Palomar || PLS || — || align=right | 3.1 km || 
|-id=355 bgcolor=#C2FFFF
| 23355 Elephenor || 9602 P-L ||  || October 17, 1960 || Palomar || PLS || L4 || align=right | 22 km || 
|-id=356 bgcolor=#d6d6d6
| 23356 || 1194 T-1 || — || March 25, 1971 || Palomar || PLS || — || align=right | 7.9 km || 
|-id=357 bgcolor=#fefefe
| 23357 || 1285 T-1 || — || March 25, 1971 || Palomar || PLS || — || align=right | 2.2 km || 
|-id=358 bgcolor=#E9E9E9
| 23358 || 2194 T-1 || — || March 25, 1971 || Palomar || PLS || MIS || align=right | 4.1 km || 
|-id=359 bgcolor=#fefefe
| 23359 || 2301 T-1 || — || March 25, 1971 || Palomar || PLS || FLO || align=right | 2.9 km || 
|-id=360 bgcolor=#fefefe
| 23360 || 3101 T-1 || — || March 26, 1971 || Palomar || PLS || NYS || align=right | 4.9 km || 
|-id=361 bgcolor=#fefefe
| 23361 || 3243 T-1 || — || March 26, 1971 || Palomar || PLS || — || align=right | 2.6 km || 
|-id=362 bgcolor=#fefefe
| 23362 || 3248 T-1 || — || March 26, 1971 || Palomar || PLS || — || align=right | 1.2 km || 
|-id=363 bgcolor=#fefefe
| 23363 || 3770 T-1 || — || May 13, 1971 || Palomar || PLS || — || align=right | 2.6 km || 
|-id=364 bgcolor=#fefefe
| 23364 || 4060 T-1 || — || March 26, 1971 || Palomar || PLS || — || align=right | 1.7 km || 
|-id=365 bgcolor=#fefefe
| 23365 || 4217 T-1 || — || March 26, 1971 || Palomar || PLS || NYS || align=right | 1.9 km || 
|-id=366 bgcolor=#fefefe
| 23366 || 1043 T-2 || — || September 29, 1973 || Palomar || PLS || NYS || align=right | 1.9 km || 
|-id=367 bgcolor=#d6d6d6
| 23367 || 1173 T-2 || — || September 29, 1973 || Palomar || PLS || EOS || align=right | 4.8 km || 
|-id=368 bgcolor=#E9E9E9
| 23368 || 1196 T-2 || — || September 29, 1973 || Palomar || PLS || — || align=right | 3.4 km || 
|-id=369 bgcolor=#E9E9E9
| 23369 || 1295 T-2 || — || September 29, 1973 || Palomar || PLS || — || align=right | 4.2 km || 
|-id=370 bgcolor=#d6d6d6
| 23370 || 1329 T-2 || — || September 29, 1973 || Palomar || PLS || — || align=right | 8.4 km || 
|-id=371 bgcolor=#E9E9E9
| 23371 || 1364 T-2 || — || September 29, 1973 || Palomar || PLS || WIT || align=right | 3.4 km || 
|-id=372 bgcolor=#fefefe
| 23372 || 1405 T-2 || — || September 29, 1973 || Palomar || PLS || MAS || align=right | 1.8 km || 
|-id=373 bgcolor=#E9E9E9
| 23373 || 2133 T-2 || — || September 29, 1973 || Palomar || PLS || HEN || align=right | 2.8 km || 
|-id=374 bgcolor=#d6d6d6
| 23374 || 2207 T-2 || — || September 29, 1973 || Palomar || PLS || THM || align=right | 7.7 km || 
|-id=375 bgcolor=#d6d6d6
| 23375 || 2234 T-2 || — || September 29, 1973 || Palomar || PLS || — || align=right | 7.5 km || 
|-id=376 bgcolor=#d6d6d6
| 23376 || 2239 T-2 || — || September 29, 1973 || Palomar || PLS || THM || align=right | 6.0 km || 
|-id=377 bgcolor=#fefefe
| 23377 || 3035 T-2 || — || September 30, 1973 || Palomar || PLS || NYS || align=right | 2.0 km || 
|-id=378 bgcolor=#fefefe
| 23378 || 3043 T-2 || — || September 30, 1973 || Palomar || PLS || V || align=right | 1.7 km || 
|-id=379 bgcolor=#E9E9E9
| 23379 || 3159 T-2 || — || September 30, 1973 || Palomar || PLS || — || align=right | 3.6 km || 
|-id=380 bgcolor=#d6d6d6
| 23380 || 3197 T-2 || — || September 30, 1973 || Palomar || PLS || — || align=right | 4.2 km || 
|-id=381 bgcolor=#d6d6d6
| 23381 || 3363 T-2 || — || September 25, 1973 || Palomar || PLS || — || align=right | 5.5 km || 
|-id=382 bgcolor=#C2FFFF
| 23382 Epistrophos || 4536 T-2 ||  || September 30, 1973 || Palomar || PLS || L4 || align=right | 24 km || 
|-id=383 bgcolor=#C2FFFF
| 23383 Schedios || 5146 T-2 ||  || September 25, 1973 || Palomar || PLS || L4 || align=right | 23 km || 
|-id=384 bgcolor=#d6d6d6
| 23384 || 5163 T-2 || — || September 25, 1973 || Palomar || PLS || — || align=right | 7.2 km || 
|-id=385 bgcolor=#d6d6d6
| 23385 || 5168 T-2 || — || September 25, 1973 || Palomar || PLS || EOS || align=right | 5.3 km || 
|-id=386 bgcolor=#d6d6d6
| 23386 || 5179 T-2 || — || September 25, 1973 || Palomar || PLS || EOS || align=right | 4.6 km || 
|-id=387 bgcolor=#E9E9E9
| 23387 || 1039 T-3 || — || October 17, 1977 || Palomar || PLS || — || align=right | 6.2 km || 
|-id=388 bgcolor=#E9E9E9
| 23388 || 1168 T-3 || — || October 17, 1977 || Palomar || PLS || — || align=right | 3.8 km || 
|-id=389 bgcolor=#d6d6d6
| 23389 || 1181 T-3 || — || October 17, 1977 || Palomar || PLS || — || align=right | 5.9 km || 
|-id=390 bgcolor=#d6d6d6
| 23390 || 1186 T-3 || — || October 17, 1977 || Palomar || PLS || URS || align=right | 7.5 km || 
|-id=391 bgcolor=#fefefe
| 23391 || 2065 T-3 || — || October 16, 1977 || Palomar || PLS || — || align=right | 1.7 km || 
|-id=392 bgcolor=#fefefe
| 23392 || 2416 T-3 || — || October 16, 1977 || Palomar || PLS || NYS || align=right | 5.0 km || 
|-id=393 bgcolor=#E9E9E9
| 23393 || 3283 T-3 || — || October 16, 1977 || Palomar || PLS || — || align=right | 3.4 km || 
|-id=394 bgcolor=#fefefe
| 23394 || 4340 T-3 || — || October 16, 1977 || Palomar || PLS || V || align=right | 2.1 km || 
|-id=395 bgcolor=#E9E9E9
| 23395 || 5018 T-3 || — || October 16, 1977 || Palomar || PLS || MAR || align=right | 4.2 km || 
|-id=396 bgcolor=#E9E9E9
| 23396 || 5112 T-3 || — || October 16, 1977 || Palomar || PLS || — || align=right | 3.5 km || 
|-id=397 bgcolor=#fefefe
| 23397 || 5122 T-3 || — || October 16, 1977 || Palomar || PLS || — || align=right | 5.5 km || 
|-id=398 bgcolor=#fefefe
| 23398 || 5124 T-3 || — || October 16, 1977 || Palomar || PLS || V || align=right | 2.5 km || 
|-id=399 bgcolor=#d6d6d6
| 23399 || 5132 T-3 || — || October 16, 1977 || Palomar || PLS || EOS || align=right | 6.5 km || 
|-id=400 bgcolor=#d6d6d6
| 23400 || A913 CF || — || February 11, 1913 || Mount Hamilton || H. D. Curtis || EOS || align=right | 4.2 km || 
|}

23401–23500 

|-bgcolor=#fefefe
| 23401 Brodskaya ||  ||  || July 25, 1968 || Cerro El Roble || G. A. Plyugin, Yu. A. Belyaev || FLO || align=right | 1.6 km || 
|-id=402 bgcolor=#d6d6d6
| 23402 Turchina ||  ||  || October 8, 1969 || Nauchnij || L. I. Chernykh || — || align=right | 10 km || 
|-id=403 bgcolor=#fefefe
| 23403 Boudewijnbuch || 1971 FB ||  || March 24, 1971 || Palomar || T. Gehrels || — || align=right | 4.4 km || 
|-id=404 bgcolor=#fefefe
| 23404 Bomans || 1972 RG ||  || September 15, 1972 || Palomar || T. Gehrels || PHO || align=right | 3.6 km || 
|-id=405 bgcolor=#d6d6d6
| 23405 Nisyros ||  ||  || September 19, 1973 || Palomar || C. J. van Houten, I. van Houten-Groeneveld, T. Gehrels || 3:2 || align=right | 15 km || 
|-id=406 bgcolor=#fefefe
| 23406 Kozlov ||  ||  || August 23, 1977 || Nauchnij || N. S. Chernykh || NYS || align=right | 3.6 km || 
|-id=407 bgcolor=#fefefe
| 23407 ||  || — || September 9, 1977 || Palomar || C. M. Olmstead || — || align=right | 1.4 km || 
|-id=408 bgcolor=#d6d6d6
| 23408 Beijingaoyun ||  ||  || October 12, 1977 || Nanking || Purple Mountain Obs. || INA || align=right | 17 km || 
|-id=409 bgcolor=#fefefe
| 23409 Derzhavin ||  ||  || August 31, 1978 || Nauchnij || N. S. Chernykh || — || align=right | 3.3 km || 
|-id=410 bgcolor=#fefefe
| 23410 Vikuznetsov ||  ||  || August 31, 1978 || Nauchnij || N. S. Chernykh || — || align=right | 3.0 km || 
|-id=411 bgcolor=#fefefe
| 23411 Bayanova ||  ||  || September 26, 1978 || Nauchnij || L. V. Zhuravleva || — || align=right | 3.6 km || 
|-id=412 bgcolor=#E9E9E9
| 23412 ||  || — || October 27, 1978 || Palomar || C. M. Olmstead || — || align=right | 3.5 km || 
|-id=413 bgcolor=#E9E9E9
| 23413 ||  || — || November 7, 1978 || Palomar || E. F. Helin, S. J. Bus || — || align=right | 4.9 km || 
|-id=414 bgcolor=#fefefe
| 23414 ||  || — || June 25, 1979 || Siding Spring || E. F. Helin, S. J. Bus || — || align=right | 5.3 km || 
|-id=415 bgcolor=#fefefe
| 23415 ||  || — || June 25, 1979 || Siding Spring || E. F. Helin, S. J. Bus || — || align=right | 5.1 km || 
|-id=416 bgcolor=#fefefe
| 23416 ||  || — || June 25, 1979 || Siding Spring || E. F. Helin, S. J. Bus || NYS || align=right | 2.4 km || 
|-id=417 bgcolor=#E9E9E9
| 23417 ||  || — || June 25, 1979 || Siding Spring || E. F. Helin, S. J. Bus || — || align=right | 3.4 km || 
|-id=418 bgcolor=#fefefe
| 23418 ||  || — || August 22, 1979 || La Silla || C.-I. Lagerkvist || — || align=right | 1.9 km || 
|-id=419 bgcolor=#d6d6d6
| 23419 ||  || — || March 16, 1980 || La Silla || C.-I. Lagerkvist || EOS || align=right | 6.5 km || 
|-id=420 bgcolor=#E9E9E9
| 23420 || 1981 DO || — || February 28, 1981 || Siding Spring || S. J. Bus || — || align=right | 2.7 km || 
|-id=421 bgcolor=#d6d6d6
| 23421 || 1981 DR || — || February 28, 1981 || Siding Spring || S. J. Bus || NAE || align=right | 7.9 km || 
|-id=422 bgcolor=#d6d6d6
| 23422 ||  || — || February 28, 1981 || Siding Spring || S. J. Bus || — || align=right | 5.9 km || 
|-id=423 bgcolor=#fefefe
| 23423 ||  || — || March 2, 1981 || Siding Spring || S. J. Bus || — || align=right | 2.0 km || 
|-id=424 bgcolor=#fefefe
| 23424 ||  || — || March 1, 1981 || Siding Spring || S. J. Bus || FLO || align=right | 3.4 km || 
|-id=425 bgcolor=#fefefe
| 23425 ||  || — || March 1, 1981 || Siding Spring || S. J. Bus || — || align=right | 1.8 km || 
|-id=426 bgcolor=#fefefe
| 23426 ||  || — || March 1, 1981 || Siding Spring || S. J. Bus || — || align=right | 2.1 km || 
|-id=427 bgcolor=#E9E9E9
| 23427 ||  || — || March 1, 1981 || Siding Spring || S. J. Bus || — || align=right | 7.1 km || 
|-id=428 bgcolor=#E9E9E9
| 23428 ||  || — || March 2, 1981 || Siding Spring || S. J. Bus || — || align=right | 2.2 km || 
|-id=429 bgcolor=#fefefe
| 23429 ||  || — || March 2, 1981 || Siding Spring || S. J. Bus || — || align=right | 2.2 km || 
|-id=430 bgcolor=#E9E9E9
| 23430 ||  || — || March 1, 1981 || Siding Spring || S. J. Bus || — || align=right | 5.1 km || 
|-id=431 bgcolor=#fefefe
| 23431 ||  || — || March 7, 1981 || Siding Spring || S. J. Bus || FLO || align=right | 1.3 km || 
|-id=432 bgcolor=#d6d6d6
| 23432 ||  || — || March 2, 1981 || Siding Spring || S. J. Bus || — || align=right | 4.3 km || 
|-id=433 bgcolor=#d6d6d6
| 23433 ||  || — || October 24, 1981 || Palomar || S. J. Bus || VER || align=right | 13 km || 
|-id=434 bgcolor=#E9E9E9
| 23434 ||  || — || October 24, 1981 || Palomar || S. J. Bus || — || align=right | 4.6 km || 
|-id=435 bgcolor=#fefefe
| 23435 ||  || — || October 25, 1981 || Palomar || S. J. Bus || — || align=right | 3.7 km || 
|-id=436 bgcolor=#d6d6d6
| 23436 Alekfursenko ||  ||  || October 21, 1982 || Nauchnij || L. V. Zhuravleva || HYG || align=right | 8.4 km || 
|-id=437 bgcolor=#fefefe
| 23437 Šíma ||  ||  || September 27, 1984 || Kleť || A. Mrkos || — || align=right | 2.7 km || 
|-id=438 bgcolor=#fefefe
| 23438 ||  || — || September 21, 1984 || La Silla || H. Debehogne || — || align=right | 2.2 km || 
|-id=439 bgcolor=#E9E9E9
| 23439 || 1986 PP || — || August 1, 1986 || Palomar || E. F. Helin || — || align=right | 6.7 km || 
|-id=440 bgcolor=#d6d6d6
| 23440 ||  || — || August 27, 1986 || La Silla || H. Debehogne || — || align=right | 10 km || 
|-id=441 bgcolor=#d6d6d6
| 23441 ||  || — || August 27, 1986 || La Silla || H. Debehogne || THM || align=right | 8.1 km || 
|-id=442 bgcolor=#d6d6d6
| 23442 ||  || — || August 28, 1986 || La Silla || H. Debehogne || HYG || align=right | 11 km || 
|-id=443 bgcolor=#E9E9E9
| 23443 Kikwaya ||  ||  || October 4, 1986 || Anderson Mesa || E. Bowell || MAR || align=right | 8.0 km || 
|-id=444 bgcolor=#E9E9E9
| 23444 Kukučín ||  ||  || October 5, 1986 || Piwnice || M. Antal || RAF || align=right | 5.2 km || 
|-id=445 bgcolor=#d6d6d6
| 23445 ||  || — || August 21, 1987 || La Silla || E. W. Elst || — || align=right | 7.0 km || 
|-id=446 bgcolor=#fefefe
| 23446 ||  || — || September 19, 1987 || Smolyan || E. W. Elst || NYS || align=right | 3.5 km || 
|-id=447 bgcolor=#fefefe
| 23447 || 1987 VG || — || November 15, 1987 || Kushiro || S. Ueda, H. Kaneda || — || align=right | 3.6 km || 
|-id=448 bgcolor=#E9E9E9
| 23448 || 1988 BG || — || January 18, 1988 || Kushiro || M. Matsuyama, K. Watanabe || EUN || align=right | 6.1 km || 
|-id=449 bgcolor=#E9E9E9
| 23449 ||  || — || January 28, 1988 || Siding Spring || R. H. McNaught || EUN || align=right | 4.0 km || 
|-id=450 bgcolor=#fefefe
| 23450 Birkenstock ||  ||  || February 13, 1988 || La Silla || E. W. Elst || — || align=right | 2.9 km || 
|-id=451 bgcolor=#fefefe
| 23451 ||  || — || February 15, 1988 || La Silla || E. W. Elst || — || align=right | 2.3 km || 
|-id=452 bgcolor=#fefefe
| 23452 Drew || 1988 QF ||  || August 18, 1988 || Palomar || C. S. Shoemaker, E. M. Shoemaker || H || align=right | 1.9 km || 
|-id=453 bgcolor=#d6d6d6
| 23453 || 1988 QR || — || August 19, 1988 || Siding Spring || R. H. McNaught || — || align=right | 10 km || 
|-id=454 bgcolor=#E9E9E9
| 23454 ||  || — || December 1, 1988 || Brorfelde || P. Jensen || — || align=right | 5.5 km || 
|-id=455 bgcolor=#d6d6d6
| 23455 Fumi ||  ||  || December 5, 1988 || Kiso || T. Nakamura || EOS || align=right | 8.7 km || 
|-id=456 bgcolor=#fefefe
| 23456 || 1989 DB || — || February 26, 1989 || Toyota || K. Suzuki, T. Furuta || — || align=right | 3.9 km || 
|-id=457 bgcolor=#E9E9E9
| 23457 Beiderbecke ||  ||  || April 5, 1989 || La Silla || M. Geffert || — || align=right | 4.4 km || 
|-id=458 bgcolor=#E9E9E9
| 23458 ||  || — || September 6, 1989 || Palomar || E. F. Helin || — || align=right | 7.2 km || 
|-id=459 bgcolor=#E9E9E9
| 23459 ||  || — || September 26, 1989 || La Silla || E. W. Elst || — || align=right | 9.0 km || 
|-id=460 bgcolor=#fefefe
| 23460 ||  || — || September 26, 1989 || La Silla || H. Debehogne || — || align=right | 2.5 km || 
|-id=461 bgcolor=#E9E9E9
| 23461 ||  || — || October 7, 1989 || La Silla || E. W. Elst || — || align=right | 5.2 km || 
|-id=462 bgcolor=#E9E9E9
| 23462 ||  || — || October 7, 1989 || La Silla || E. W. Elst || — || align=right | 3.1 km || 
|-id=463 bgcolor=#C2FFFF
| 23463 ||  || — || October 2, 1989 || Cerro Tololo || S. J. Bus || L5 || align=right | 26 km || 
|-id=464 bgcolor=#fefefe
| 23464 ||  || — || October 3, 1989 || La Silla || H. Debehogne || — || align=right | 2.6 km || 
|-id=465 bgcolor=#fefefe
| 23465 Yamashitakouhei ||  ||  || October 24, 1989 || Kitami || M. Yanai, K. Watanabe || FLO || align=right | 2.9 km || 
|-id=466 bgcolor=#fefefe
| 23466 ||  || — || February 28, 1990 || La Silla || H. Debehogne || — || align=right | 6.1 km || 
|-id=467 bgcolor=#E9E9E9
| 23467 ||  || — || August 20, 1990 || Palomar || E. F. Helin || — || align=right | 2.6 km || 
|-id=468 bgcolor=#E9E9E9
| 23468 Kannabe ||  ||  || September 20, 1990 || Geisei || T. Seki || — || align=right | 7.1 km || 
|-id=469 bgcolor=#E9E9E9
| 23469 Neilpeart ||  ||  || September 22, 1990 || Palomar || B. Roman || EUN || align=right | 6.3 km || 
|-id=470 bgcolor=#E9E9E9
| 23470 ||  || — || September 22, 1990 || La Silla || E. W. Elst || — || align=right | 5.2 km || 
|-id=471 bgcolor=#E9E9E9
| 23471 Kawatamasaaki ||  ||  || October 15, 1990 || Kitami || K. Endate, K. Watanabe || — || align=right | 8.6 km || 
|-id=472 bgcolor=#E9E9E9
| 23472 Rolfriekher ||  ||  || October 10, 1990 || Tautenburg Observatory || L. D. Schmadel, F. Börngen || — || align=right | 4.1 km || 
|-id=473 bgcolor=#E9E9E9
| 23473 Voss ||  ||  || October 11, 1990 || Tautenburg Observatory || F. Börngen, L. D. Schmadel || — || align=right | 6.6 km || 
|-id=474 bgcolor=#E9E9E9
| 23474 ||  || — || October 20, 1990 || Siding Spring || R. H. McNaught || — || align=right | 4.9 km || 
|-id=475 bgcolor=#E9E9E9
| 23475 Nakazawa ||  ||  || November 13, 1990 || Kitami || K. Endate, K. Watanabe || — || align=right | 6.0 km || 
|-id=476 bgcolor=#E9E9E9
| 23476 ||  || — || November 15, 1990 || Ojima || T. Niijima, T. Urata || — || align=right | 3.8 km || 
|-id=477 bgcolor=#E9E9E9
| 23477 Wallenstadt ||  ||  || November 18, 1990 || La Silla || E. W. Elst || EUN || align=right | 5.5 km || 
|-id=478 bgcolor=#E9E9E9
| 23478 Chikumagawa || 1991 BZ ||  || January 21, 1991 || Geisei || T. Seki || slow || align=right | 7.9 km || 
|-id=479 bgcolor=#d6d6d6
| 23479 || 1991 CG || — || February 5, 1991 || Yorii || M. Arai, H. Mori || MEL || align=right | 14 km || 
|-id=480 bgcolor=#C2FFFF
| 23480 || 1991 EL || — || March 10, 1991 || Siding Spring || R. H. McNaught || L4 || align=right | 28 km || 
|-id=481 bgcolor=#fefefe
| 23481 ||  || — || April 8, 1991 || La Silla || E. W. Elst || FLO || align=right | 2.9 km || 
|-id=482 bgcolor=#fefefe
| 23482 || 1991 LV || — || June 14, 1991 || Palomar || E. F. Helin || H || align=right | 4.5 km || 
|-id=483 bgcolor=#fefefe
| 23483 ||  || — || June 6, 1991 || La Silla || E. W. Elst || FLO || align=right | 2.4 km || 
|-id=484 bgcolor=#fefefe
| 23484 ||  || — || July 12, 1991 || Palomar || H. E. Holt || — || align=right | 6.2 km || 
|-id=485 bgcolor=#d6d6d6
| 23485 ||  || — || July 12, 1991 || La Silla || H. Debehogne || — || align=right | 11 km || 
|-id=486 bgcolor=#fefefe
| 23486 ||  || — || August 2, 1991 || La Silla || E. W. Elst || NYS || align=right | 1.6 km || 
|-id=487 bgcolor=#d6d6d6
| 23487 ||  || — || August 3, 1991 || La Silla || E. W. Elst || THM || align=right | 9.5 km || 
|-id=488 bgcolor=#fefefe
| 23488 ||  || — || August 7, 1991 || Palomar || H. E. Holt || — || align=right | 2.9 km || 
|-id=489 bgcolor=#fefefe
| 23489 ||  || — || August 7, 1991 || Palomar || H. E. Holt || — || align=right | 6.8 km || 
|-id=490 bgcolor=#E9E9E9
| 23490 Monikohl ||  ||  || September 12, 1991 || Tautenburg Observatory || L. D. Schmadel, F. Börngen || — || align=right | 5.1 km || 
|-id=491 bgcolor=#fefefe
| 23491 ||  || — || September 13, 1991 || Palomar || H. E. Holt || — || align=right | 4.6 km || 
|-id=492 bgcolor=#fefefe
| 23492 ||  || — || September 14, 1991 || Palomar || H. E. Holt || V || align=right | 2.8 km || 
|-id=493 bgcolor=#E9E9E9
| 23493 || 1991 SO || — || September 30, 1991 || Siding Spring || R. H. McNaught || — || align=right | 2.8 km || 
|-id=494 bgcolor=#fefefe
| 23494 ||  || — || September 16, 1991 || Palomar || H. E. Holt || NYS || align=right | 3.0 km || 
|-id=495 bgcolor=#fefefe
| 23495 Nagaotoshiko ||  ||  || October 29, 1991 || Kitami || A. Takahashi, K. Watanabe || — || align=right | 7.9 km || 
|-id=496 bgcolor=#E9E9E9
| 23496 ||  || — || November 3, 1991 || Palomar || E. F. Helin || — || align=right | 2.8 km || 
|-id=497 bgcolor=#E9E9E9
| 23497 ||  || — || November 5, 1991 || Dynic || A. Sugie || — || align=right | 3.8 km || 
|-id=498 bgcolor=#fefefe
| 23498 ||  || — || November 6, 1991 || La Silla || E. W. Elst || — || align=right | 4.0 km || 
|-id=499 bgcolor=#E9E9E9
| 23499 ||  || — || November 11, 1991 || Kushiro || S. Ueda, H. Kaneda || MRX || align=right | 4.1 km || 
|-id=500 bgcolor=#E9E9E9
| 23500 ||  || — || January 9, 1992 || Kitt Peak || Spacewatch || — || align=right | 4.0 km || 
|}

23501–23600 

|-bgcolor=#E9E9E9
| 23501 ||  || — || February 12, 1992 || Mérida || O. A. Naranjo, J. Stock || slow || align=right | 4.6 km || 
|-id=502 bgcolor=#fefefe
| 23502 ||  || — || February 25, 1992 || Kitt Peak || Spacewatch || — || align=right | 3.1 km || 
|-id=503 bgcolor=#E9E9E9
| 23503 ||  || — || February 29, 1992 || Kitt Peak || Spacewatch || — || align=right | 5.6 km || 
|-id=504 bgcolor=#E9E9E9
| 23504 Haneda || 1992 EX ||  || March 7, 1992 || Geisei || T. Seki || — || align=right | 4.7 km || 
|-id=505 bgcolor=#E9E9E9
| 23505 ||  || — || March 1, 1992 || La Silla || UESAC || — || align=right | 3.3 km || 
|-id=506 bgcolor=#E9E9E9
| 23506 ||  || — || March 2, 1992 || La Silla || UESAC || — || align=right | 3.9 km || 
|-id=507 bgcolor=#E9E9E9
| 23507 ||  || — || March 2, 1992 || La Silla || UESAC || PAD || align=right | 7.7 km || 
|-id=508 bgcolor=#E9E9E9
| 23508 ||  || — || March 1, 1992 || La Silla || UESAC || — || align=right | 3.5 km || 
|-id=509 bgcolor=#d6d6d6
| 23509 ||  || — || April 30, 1992 || Kitt Peak || Spacewatch || — || align=right | 3.6 km || 
|-id=510 bgcolor=#fefefe
| 23510 ||  || — || August 4, 1992 || Palomar || H. E. Holt || FLO || align=right | 2.2 km || 
|-id=511 bgcolor=#d6d6d6
| 23511 ||  || — || August 4, 1992 || Palomar || H. E. Holt || HYG || align=right | 9.9 km || 
|-id=512 bgcolor=#d6d6d6
| 23512 ||  || — || August 6, 1992 || Palomar || H. E. Holt || — || align=right | 7.8 km || 
|-id=513 bgcolor=#fefefe
| 23513 ||  || — || August 2, 1992 || Palomar || H. E. Holt || FLO || align=right | 3.6 km || 
|-id=514 bgcolor=#fefefe
| 23514 Schneider || 1992 RU ||  || September 2, 1992 || Tautenburg Observatory || F. Börngen, L. D. Schmadel || — || align=right | 2.6 km || 
|-id=515 bgcolor=#fefefe
| 23515 ||  || — || September 2, 1992 || La Silla || E. W. Elst || FLO || align=right | 2.2 km || 
|-id=516 bgcolor=#fefefe
| 23516 ||  || — || September 2, 1992 || La Silla || E. W. Elst || — || align=right | 5.9 km || 
|-id=517 bgcolor=#d6d6d6
| 23517 ||  || — || September 2, 1992 || La Silla || E. W. Elst || THM || align=right | 7.9 km || 
|-id=518 bgcolor=#d6d6d6
| 23518 ||  || — || September 20, 1992 || Kushiro || S. Ueda, H. Kaneda || — || align=right | 9.9 km || 
|-id=519 bgcolor=#fefefe
| 23519 ||  || — || September 23, 1992 || Palomar || E. F. Helin || — || align=right | 2.6 km || 
|-id=520 bgcolor=#fefefe
| 23520 Ludwigbechstein ||  ||  || September 23, 1992 || Tautenburg Observatory || F. Börngen || V || align=right | 1.7 km || 
|-id=521 bgcolor=#fefefe
| 23521 ||  || — || October 21, 1992 || Kiyosato || S. Otomo || V || align=right | 2.9 km || 
|-id=522 bgcolor=#fefefe
| 23522 ||  || — || November 18, 1992 || Kushiro || S. Ueda, H. Kaneda || V || align=right | 3.1 km || 
|-id=523 bgcolor=#E9E9E9
| 23523 || 1993 AQ || — || January 13, 1993 || Kushiro || S. Ueda, H. Kaneda || — || align=right | 8.9 km || 
|-id=524 bgcolor=#E9E9E9
| 23524 Yuichitsuda ||  ||  || January 23, 1993 || Kitami || K. Endate, K. Watanabe || — || align=right | 4.3 km || 
|-id=525 bgcolor=#E9E9E9
| 23525 ||  || — || March 21, 1993 || La Silla || UESAC || — || align=right | 2.7 km || 
|-id=526 bgcolor=#E9E9E9
| 23526 ||  || — || March 21, 1993 || La Silla || UESAC || — || align=right | 2.6 km || 
|-id=527 bgcolor=#E9E9E9
| 23527 ||  || — || March 19, 1993 || La Silla || UESAC || — || align=right | 3.1 km || 
|-id=528 bgcolor=#fefefe
| 23528 ||  || — || March 19, 1993 || La Silla || UESAC || — || align=right | 2.2 km || 
|-id=529 bgcolor=#E9E9E9
| 23529 ||  || — || March 19, 1993 || La Silla || UESAC || — || align=right | 3.5 km || 
|-id=530 bgcolor=#E9E9E9
| 23530 ||  || — || March 19, 1993 || La Silla || UESAC || — || align=right | 3.9 km || 
|-id=531 bgcolor=#E9E9E9
| 23531 ||  || — || March 19, 1993 || La Silla || UESAC || — || align=right | 3.0 km || 
|-id=532 bgcolor=#E9E9E9
| 23532 ||  || — || May 14, 1993 || La Silla || E. W. Elst || — || align=right | 2.7 km || 
|-id=533 bgcolor=#E9E9E9
| 23533 ||  || — || August 15, 1993 || Caussols || E. W. Elst || AGN || align=right | 3.4 km || 
|-id=534 bgcolor=#d6d6d6
| 23534 ||  || — || August 18, 1993 || Caussols || E. W. Elst || — || align=right | 4.4 km || 
|-id=535 bgcolor=#d6d6d6
| 23535 ||  || — || August 20, 1993 || La Silla || E. W. Elst || — || align=right | 3.3 km || 
|-id=536 bgcolor=#d6d6d6
| 23536 ||  || — || August 20, 1993 || La Silla || E. W. Elst || EOS || align=right | 4.9 km || 
|-id=537 bgcolor=#d6d6d6
| 23537 ||  || — || September 17, 1993 || La Silla || E. W. Elst || THM || align=right | 6.4 km || 
|-id=538 bgcolor=#d6d6d6
| 23538 ||  || — || October 9, 1993 || La Silla || E. W. Elst || — || align=right | 6.1 km || 
|-id=539 bgcolor=#d6d6d6
| 23539 ||  || — || October 9, 1993 || La Silla || E. W. Elst || THM || align=right | 6.2 km || 
|-id=540 bgcolor=#d6d6d6
| 23540 ||  || — || October 9, 1993 || La Silla || E. W. Elst || KOR || align=right | 5.6 km || 
|-id=541 bgcolor=#d6d6d6
| 23541 ||  || — || October 9, 1993 || La Silla || E. W. Elst || — || align=right | 7.2 km || 
|-id=542 bgcolor=#d6d6d6
| 23542 ||  || — || October 9, 1993 || La Silla || E. W. Elst || — || align=right | 7.0 km || 
|-id=543 bgcolor=#d6d6d6
| 23543 Saiki || 1993 UK ||  || October 16, 1993 || Kitami || K. Endate, K. Watanabe || KOR || align=right | 7.2 km || 
|-id=544 bgcolor=#d6d6d6
| 23544 || 1993 XW || — || December 11, 1993 || Oizumi || T. Kobayashi || ALA || align=right | 19 km || 
|-id=545 bgcolor=#fefefe
| 23545 || 1994 AC || — || January 2, 1994 || Oizumi || T. Kobayashi || FLO || align=right | 3.2 km || 
|-id=546 bgcolor=#fefefe
| 23546 ||  || — || January 8, 1994 || Kitt Peak || Spacewatch || FLO || align=right | 1.9 km || 
|-id=547 bgcolor=#E9E9E9
| 23547 Tognelli || 1994 DG ||  || February 17, 1994 || San Marcello || L. Tesi, G. Cattani || GEF || align=right | 4.6 km || 
|-id=548 bgcolor=#FFC2E0
| 23548 ||  || — || March 11, 1994 || Palomar || K. J. Lawrence || AMO +1km || align=right | 1.4 km || 
|-id=549 bgcolor=#C2FFFF
| 23549 Epicles ||  ||  || March 9, 1994 || Caussols || E. W. Elst || L5 || align=right | 18 km || 
|-id=550 bgcolor=#fefefe
| 23550 ||  || — || April 11, 1994 || Palomar || E. F. Helin || FLO || align=right | 3.7 km || 
|-id=551 bgcolor=#fefefe
| 23551 ||  || — || April 11, 1994 || Palomar || E. F. Helin || — || align=right | 5.0 km || 
|-id=552 bgcolor=#fefefe
| 23552 || 1994 NB || — || July 3, 1994 || Palomar || E. F. Helin || PHO || align=right | 5.2 km || 
|-id=553 bgcolor=#fefefe
| 23553 ||  || — || August 10, 1994 || La Silla || E. W. Elst || — || align=right | 3.7 km || 
|-id=554 bgcolor=#fefefe
| 23554 ||  || — || August 10, 1994 || La Silla || E. W. Elst || NYS || align=right | 3.0 km || 
|-id=555 bgcolor=#E9E9E9
| 23555 ||  || — || August 10, 1994 || La Silla || E. W. Elst || — || align=right | 2.7 km || 
|-id=556 bgcolor=#E9E9E9
| 23556 ||  || — || August 12, 1994 || La Silla || E. W. Elst || — || align=right | 2.9 km || 
|-id=557 bgcolor=#E9E9E9
| 23557 ||  || — || August 12, 1994 || La Silla || E. W. Elst || — || align=right | 2.1 km || 
|-id=558 bgcolor=#E9E9E9
| 23558 ||  || — || August 12, 1994 || La Silla || E. W. Elst || — || align=right | 5.5 km || 
|-id=559 bgcolor=#E9E9E9
| 23559 ||  || — || August 12, 1994 || La Silla || E. W. Elst || — || align=right | 3.0 km || 
|-id=560 bgcolor=#d6d6d6
| 23560 ||  || — || September 12, 1994 || Kitt Peak || Spacewatch || — || align=right | 7.6 km || 
|-id=561 bgcolor=#E9E9E9
| 23561 ||  || — || September 1, 1994 || Palomar || E. F. Helin || EUN || align=right | 3.5 km || 
|-id=562 bgcolor=#E9E9E9
| 23562 Hyodokenichi ||  ||  || October 2, 1994 || Kitami || K. Endate, K. Watanabe || MIT || align=right | 7.4 km || 
|-id=563 bgcolor=#E9E9E9
| 23563 ||  || — || October 28, 1994 || Kitt Peak || Spacewatch || — || align=right | 6.2 km || 
|-id=564 bgcolor=#d6d6d6
| 23564 Ungaretti ||  ||  || November 6, 1994 || Colleverde || V. S. Casulli || — || align=right | 8.2 km || 
|-id=565 bgcolor=#E9E9E9
| 23565 || 1994 WB || — || November 23, 1994 || Sudbury || D. di Cicco || — || align=right | 4.7 km || 
|-id=566 bgcolor=#d6d6d6
| 23566 ||  || — || November 27, 1994 || Oizumi || T. Kobayashi || — || align=right | 9.8 km || 
|-id=567 bgcolor=#d6d6d6
| 23567 || 1994 YG || — || December 21, 1994 || Oizumi || T. Kobayashi || — || align=right | 6.6 km || 
|-id=568 bgcolor=#d6d6d6
| 23568 || 1994 YU || — || December 28, 1994 || Oizumi || T. Kobayashi || EOS || align=right | 6.2 km || 
|-id=569 bgcolor=#d6d6d6
| 23569 ||  || — || December 28, 1994 || Oizumi || T. Kobayashi || — || align=right | 7.5 km || 
|-id=570 bgcolor=#d6d6d6
| 23570 || 1995 AA || — || January 1, 1995 || Chiyoda || T. Kojima || — || align=right | 7.6 km || 
|-id=571 bgcolor=#E9E9E9
| 23571 Zuaboni || 1995 AB ||  || January 1, 1995 || Sormano || M. Cavagna, E. Galliani || — || align=right | 5.9 km || 
|-id=572 bgcolor=#d6d6d6
| 23572 ||  || — || January 10, 1995 || Chiyoda || T. Kojima || — || align=right | 8.5 km || 
|-id=573 bgcolor=#d6d6d6
| 23573 || 1995 BG || — || January 23, 1995 || Oizumi || T. Kobayashi || EOS || align=right | 8.6 km || 
|-id=574 bgcolor=#d6d6d6
| 23574 || 1995 BX || — || January 25, 1995 || Oizumi || T. Kobayashi || THM || align=right | 8.2 km || 
|-id=575 bgcolor=#d6d6d6
| 23575 ||  || — || January 30, 1995 || Oizumi || T. Kobayashi || EOS || align=right | 6.5 km || 
|-id=576 bgcolor=#d6d6d6
| 23576 ||  || — || February 21, 1995 || Kitt Peak || Spacewatch || — || align=right | 6.9 km || 
|-id=577 bgcolor=#d6d6d6
| 23577 ||  || — || February 24, 1995 || Kitt Peak || Spacewatch || 2:1J || align=right | 7.7 km || 
|-id=578 bgcolor=#d6d6d6
| 23578 Baedeker ||  ||  || February 22, 1995 || Tautenburg Observatory || F. Börngen || — || align=right | 9.7 km || 
|-id=579 bgcolor=#d6d6d6
| 23579 ||  || — || March 2, 1995 || Kitt Peak || Spacewatch || — || align=right | 8.2 km || 
|-id=580 bgcolor=#fefefe
| 23580 ||  || — || July 22, 1995 || Kitt Peak || Spacewatch || V || align=right | 1.3 km || 
|-id=581 bgcolor=#fefefe
| 23581 ||  || — || July 22, 1995 || Kitt Peak || Spacewatch || — || align=right | 2.5 km || 
|-id=582 bgcolor=#fefefe
| 23582 ||  || — || August 31, 1995 || Oizumi || T. Kobayashi || — || align=right | 3.8 km || 
|-id=583 bgcolor=#fefefe
| 23583 Křivský ||  ||  || September 22, 1995 || Ondřejov || L. Kotková || — || align=right | 5.2 km || 
|-id=584 bgcolor=#fefefe
| 23584 ||  || — || September 20, 1995 || Kitt Peak || Spacewatch || — || align=right | 2.5 km || 
|-id=585 bgcolor=#fefefe
| 23585 ||  || — || September 28, 1995 || Xinglong || SCAP || — || align=right | 2.0 km || 
|-id=586 bgcolor=#fefefe
| 23586 ||  || — || October 13, 1995 || Chichibu || N. Satō, T. Urata || — || align=right | 4.6 km || 
|-id=587 bgcolor=#fefefe
| 23587 Abukumado ||  ||  || October 2, 1995 || Geisei || T. Seki || — || align=right | 4.2 km || 
|-id=588 bgcolor=#fefefe
| 23588 ||  || — || October 20, 1995 || Oizumi || T. Kobayashi || V || align=right | 2.6 km || 
|-id=589 bgcolor=#fefefe
| 23589 ||  || — || October 23, 1995 || San Marcello || L. Tesi, A. Boattini || FLO || align=right | 1.9 km || 
|-id=590 bgcolor=#E9E9E9
| 23590 ||  || — || October 21, 1995 || Kitt Peak || Spacewatch || — || align=right | 2.2 km || 
|-id=591 bgcolor=#fefefe
| 23591 ||  || — || October 26, 1995 || Nyukasa || M. Hirasawa, S. Suzuki || V || align=right | 3.2 km || 
|-id=592 bgcolor=#d6d6d6
| 23592 ||  || — || October 27, 1995 || Kushiro || S. Ueda, H. Kaneda || EOS || align=right | 6.4 km || 
|-id=593 bgcolor=#E9E9E9
| 23593 || 1995 VJ || — || November 2, 1995 || Oizumi || T. Kobayashi || — || align=right | 3.0 km || 
|-id=594 bgcolor=#fefefe
| 23594 ||  || — || November 13, 1995 || Nachi-Katsuura || Y. Shimizu, T. Urata || — || align=right | 3.8 km || 
|-id=595 bgcolor=#fefefe
| 23595 ||  || — || November 15, 1995 || Kitt Peak || Spacewatch || — || align=right | 3.3 km || 
|-id=596 bgcolor=#E9E9E9
| 23596 || 1995 WQ || — || November 17, 1995 || Oizumi || T. Kobayashi || — || align=right | 3.5 km || 
|-id=597 bgcolor=#fefefe
| 23597 ||  || — || November 24, 1995 || Oizumi || T. Kobayashi || NYS || align=right | 2.3 km || 
|-id=598 bgcolor=#fefefe
| 23598 ||  || — || November 16, 1995 || Kitt Peak || Spacewatch || — || align=right | 4.0 km || 
|-id=599 bgcolor=#E9E9E9
| 23599 || 1995 XV || — || December 12, 1995 || Oizumi || T. Kobayashi || — || align=right | 3.0 km || 
|-id=600 bgcolor=#E9E9E9
| 23600 ||  || — || December 15, 1995 || Oizumi || T. Kobayashi || — || align=right | 5.4 km || 
|}

23601–23700 

|-bgcolor=#fefefe
| 23601 ||  || — || December 16, 1995 || Kitt Peak || Spacewatch || NYS || align=right | 2.4 km || 
|-id=602 bgcolor=#E9E9E9
| 23602 ||  || — || December 23, 1995 || Kitt Peak || Spacewatch || — || align=right | 9.5 km || 
|-id=603 bgcolor=#E9E9E9
| 23603 ||  || — || December 21, 1995 || Haleakala || NEAT || — || align=right | 5.5 km || 
|-id=604 bgcolor=#d6d6d6
| 23604 || 1996 AL || — || January 11, 1996 || Oizumi || T. Kobayashi || — || align=right | 9.4 km || 
|-id=605 bgcolor=#E9E9E9
| 23605 || 1996 AP || — || January 11, 1996 || Oizumi || T. Kobayashi || EUN || align=right | 5.0 km || 
|-id=606 bgcolor=#FFC2E0
| 23606 ||  || — || January 13, 1996 || Kitt Peak || Spacewatch || AMO || align=right data-sort-value="0.87" | 870 m || 
|-id=607 bgcolor=#E9E9E9
| 23607 ||  || — || January 13, 1996 || Oizumi || T. Kobayashi || EUN || align=right | 5.3 km || 
|-id=608 bgcolor=#E9E9E9
| 23608 Alpiapuane ||  ||  || January 15, 1996 || Cima Ekar || M. Tombelli, U. Munari || EUN || align=right | 4.6 km || 
|-id=609 bgcolor=#E9E9E9
| 23609 ||  || — || January 12, 1996 || Kitt Peak || Spacewatch || HEN || align=right | 3.4 km || 
|-id=610 bgcolor=#E9E9E9
| 23610 ||  || — || January 12, 1996 || Kitt Peak || Spacewatch || — || align=right | 7.2 km || 
|-id=611 bgcolor=#E9E9E9
| 23611 ||  || — || January 27, 1996 || Oohira || T. Urata || — || align=right | 3.2 km || 
|-id=612 bgcolor=#E9E9E9
| 23612 Ramzel ||  ||  || January 22, 1996 || Socorro || R. Weber || EUN || align=right | 5.0 km || 
|-id=613 bgcolor=#E9E9E9
| 23613 ||  || — || March 11, 1996 || Kitt Peak || Spacewatch || — || align=right | 9.2 km || 
|-id=614 bgcolor=#d6d6d6
| 23614 || 1996 FX || — || March 18, 1996 || Haleakala || NEAT || — || align=right | 6.4 km || 
|-id=615 bgcolor=#fefefe
| 23615 ||  || — || March 28, 1996 || Siding Spring || R. H. McNaught || Hslow || align=right | 3.5 km || 
|-id=616 bgcolor=#d6d6d6
| 23616 ||  || — || April 17, 1996 || La Silla || E. W. Elst || EOS || align=right | 5.8 km || 
|-id=617 bgcolor=#d6d6d6
| 23617 Duna ||  ||  || April 17, 1996 || La Silla || E. W. Elst || URS || align=right | 16 km || 
|-id=618 bgcolor=#d6d6d6
| 23618 ||  || — || May 11, 1996 || Kitt Peak || Spacewatch || — || align=right | 8.3 km || 
|-id=619 bgcolor=#d6d6d6
| 23619 ||  || — || May 12, 1996 || Kitt Peak || Spacewatch || — || align=right | 6.6 km || 
|-id=620 bgcolor=#d6d6d6
| 23620 ||  || — || June 11, 1996 || Kitt Peak || Spacewatch || — || align=right | 11 km || 
|-id=621 bgcolor=#FA8072
| 23621 || 1996 PA || — || August 5, 1996 || Siding Spring || G. J. Garradd || moon || align=right | 2.2 km || 
|-id=622 bgcolor=#C2FFFF
| 23622 ||  || — || September 12, 1996 || La Silla || UDTS || L4 || align=right | 21 km || 
|-id=623 bgcolor=#fefefe
| 23623 ||  || — || October 7, 1996 || Kitt Peak || Spacewatch || FLO || align=right | 1.6 km || 
|-id=624 bgcolor=#C2FFFF
| 23624 ||  || — || October 29, 1996 || Xinglong || SCAP || L4 || align=right | 27 km || 
|-id=625 bgcolor=#fefefe
| 23625 Gelfond || 1996 WX ||  || November 19, 1996 || Prescott || P. G. Comba || FLO || align=right | 1.5 km || 
|-id=626 bgcolor=#fefefe
| 23626 ||  || — || December 3, 1996 || Oizumi || T. Kobayashi || — || align=right | 3.0 km || 
|-id=627 bgcolor=#fefefe
| 23627 ||  || — || December 8, 1996 || Oizumi || T. Kobayashi || — || align=right | 2.9 km || 
|-id=628 bgcolor=#fefefe
| 23628 Ichimura ||  ||  || December 8, 1996 || Chichibu || N. Satō || — || align=right | 2.4 km || 
|-id=629 bgcolor=#fefefe
| 23629 || 1996 YR || — || December 20, 1996 || Oizumi || T. Kobayashi || FLO || align=right | 2.9 km || 
|-id=630 bgcolor=#fefefe
| 23630 ||  || — || December 30, 1996 || Chichibu || N. Satō || — || align=right | 1.9 km || 
|-id=631 bgcolor=#fefefe
| 23631 || 1997 AG || — || January 2, 1997 || Oizumi || T. Kobayashi || — || align=right | 3.3 km || 
|-id=632 bgcolor=#fefefe
| 23632 || 1997 AQ || — || January 2, 1997 || Oizumi || T. Kobayashi || — || align=right | 2.9 km || 
|-id=633 bgcolor=#fefefe
| 23633 ||  || — || January 4, 1997 || Oizumi || T. Kobayashi || — || align=right | 5.2 km || 
|-id=634 bgcolor=#fefefe
| 23634 ||  || — || January 6, 1997 || Oizumi || T. Kobayashi || FLO || align=right | 2.6 km || 
|-id=635 bgcolor=#fefefe
| 23635 ||  || — || January 6, 1997 || Oizumi || T. Kobayashi || NYS || align=right | 1.5 km || 
|-id=636 bgcolor=#fefefe
| 23636 ||  || — || January 6, 1997 || Oizumi || T. Kobayashi || FLO || align=right | 3.8 km || 
|-id=637 bgcolor=#fefefe
| 23637 ||  || — || January 4, 1997 || Xinglong || SCAP || V || align=right | 1.8 km || 
|-id=638 bgcolor=#fefefe
| 23638 Nagano ||  ||  || January 6, 1997 || Chichibu || N. Satō || — || align=right | 2.1 km || 
|-id=639 bgcolor=#fefefe
| 23639 ||  || — || January 9, 1997 || Oizumi || T. Kobayashi || — || align=right | 3.6 km || 
|-id=640 bgcolor=#fefefe
| 23640 ||  || — || January 2, 1997 || Kitt Peak || Spacewatch || V || align=right | 3.0 km || 
|-id=641 bgcolor=#fefefe
| 23641 ||  || — || January 9, 1997 || Kitt Peak || Spacewatch || V || align=right | 2.5 km || 
|-id=642 bgcolor=#fefefe
| 23642 ||  || — || January 9, 1997 || Oohira || T. Urata || — || align=right | 4.6 km || 
|-id=643 bgcolor=#fefefe
| 23643 ||  || — || January 12, 1997 || Haleakala || NEAT || — || align=right | 2.9 km || 
|-id=644 bgcolor=#fefefe
| 23644 Yamaneko ||  ||  || January 13, 1997 || Kuma Kogen || A. Nakamura || MAS || align=right | 2.3 km || 
|-id=645 bgcolor=#fefefe
| 23645 ||  || — || January 30, 1997 || Oizumi || T. Kobayashi || V || align=right | 1.9 km || 
|-id=646 bgcolor=#fefefe
| 23646 ||  || — || January 30, 1997 || Oizumi || T. Kobayashi || — || align=right | 2.3 km || 
|-id=647 bgcolor=#fefefe
| 23647 ||  || — || January 31, 1997 || Oizumi || T. Kobayashi || PHO || align=right | 3.1 km || 
|-id=648 bgcolor=#fefefe
| 23648 Kolář || 1997 CB ||  || February 1, 1997 || Ondřejov || L. Kotková || — || align=right | 4.2 km || 
|-id=649 bgcolor=#fefefe
| 23649 Tohoku ||  ||  || February 1, 1997 || Chichibu || N. Satō || MAS || align=right | 2.1 km || 
|-id=650 bgcolor=#fefefe
| 23650 Čvančara ||  ||  || February 7, 1997 || Kleť || M. Tichý || FLO || align=right | 1.5 km || 
|-id=651 bgcolor=#E9E9E9
| 23651 ||  || — || February 3, 1997 || Kitt Peak || Spacewatch || — || align=right | 2.4 km || 
|-id=652 bgcolor=#fefefe
| 23652 ||  || — || February 12, 1997 || Oizumi || T. Kobayashi || NYS || align=right | 1.9 km || 
|-id=653 bgcolor=#fefefe
| 23653 ||  || — || February 6, 1997 || Kitt Peak || Spacewatch || NYS || align=right | 2.7 km || 
|-id=654 bgcolor=#fefefe
| 23654 ||  || — || February 13, 1997 || Oohira || T. Urata || NYS || align=right | 2.0 km || 
|-id=655 bgcolor=#fefefe
| 23655 ||  || — || February 14, 1997 || Oizumi || T. Kobayashi || — || align=right | 2.8 km || 
|-id=656 bgcolor=#fefefe
| 23656 ||  || — || February 14, 1997 || Oizumi || T. Kobayashi || — || align=right | 3.0 km || 
|-id=657 bgcolor=#fefefe
| 23657 ||  || — || February 6, 1997 || Xinglong || SCAP || — || align=right | 3.6 km || 
|-id=658 bgcolor=#fefefe
| 23658 ||  || — || February 6, 1997 || Xinglong || SCAP || MAS || align=right | 1.9 km || 
|-id=659 bgcolor=#fefefe
| 23659 || 1997 EH || — || March 1, 1997 || Oizumi || T. Kobayashi || NYS || align=right | 6.7 km || 
|-id=660 bgcolor=#E9E9E9
| 23660 ||  || — || March 4, 1997 || Kitt Peak || Spacewatch || — || align=right | 2.2 km || 
|-id=661 bgcolor=#E9E9E9
| 23661 ||  || — || March 5, 1997 || Kitt Peak || Spacewatch || — || align=right | 1.8 km || 
|-id=662 bgcolor=#fefefe
| 23662 ||  || — || March 3, 1997 || Kitami || K. Endate, K. Watanabe || — || align=right | 4.2 km || 
|-id=663 bgcolor=#fefefe
| 23663 Kalou ||  ||  || March 10, 1997 || Arbonne-la-Forêt || M. Meunier || V || align=right | 2.2 km || 
|-id=664 bgcolor=#fefefe
| 23664 ||  || — || March 5, 1997 || Oohira || T. Urata || — || align=right | 3.4 km || 
|-id=665 bgcolor=#fefefe
| 23665 ||  || — || March 12, 1997 || La Silla || E. W. Elst || NYS || align=right | 2.8 km || 
|-id=666 bgcolor=#E9E9E9
| 23666 ||  || — || March 30, 1997 || Kitt Peak || Spacewatch || — || align=right | 3.4 km || 
|-id=667 bgcolor=#E9E9E9
| 23667 Savinakim ||  ||  || March 31, 1997 || Socorro || LINEAR || — || align=right | 3.5 km || 
|-id=668 bgcolor=#fefefe
| 23668 Eunbekim ||  ||  || March 31, 1997 || Socorro || LINEAR || NYS || align=right | 3.1 km || 
|-id=669 bgcolor=#E9E9E9
| 23669 Huihuifan ||  ||  || March 31, 1997 || Socorro || LINEAR || — || align=right | 3.0 km || 
|-id=670 bgcolor=#E9E9E9
| 23670 ||  || — || April 3, 1997 || Socorro || LINEAR || ADE || align=right | 6.3 km || 
|-id=671 bgcolor=#E9E9E9
| 23671 ||  || — || April 3, 1997 || Socorro || LINEAR || — || align=right | 2.4 km || 
|-id=672 bgcolor=#E9E9E9
| 23672 Swiggum ||  ||  || April 6, 1997 || Socorro || LINEAR || EUN || align=right | 3.2 km || 
|-id=673 bgcolor=#E9E9E9
| 23673 Neilmehta ||  ||  || April 6, 1997 || Socorro || LINEAR || — || align=right | 3.1 km || 
|-id=674 bgcolor=#E9E9E9
| 23674 Juliebaker ||  ||  || April 6, 1997 || Socorro || LINEAR || EUN || align=right | 3.6 km || 
|-id=675 bgcolor=#E9E9E9
| 23675 Zabinski ||  ||  || April 6, 1997 || Socorro || LINEAR || — || align=right | 3.5 km || 
|-id=676 bgcolor=#fefefe
| 23676 ||  || — || April 4, 1997 || Kitami || K. Endate, K. Watanabe || NYS || align=right | 3.0 km || 
|-id=677 bgcolor=#E9E9E9
| 23677 ||  || — || April 3, 1997 || Socorro || LINEAR || EUN || align=right | 4.1 km || 
|-id=678 bgcolor=#E9E9E9
| 23678 ||  || — || April 3, 1997 || Socorro || LINEAR || — || align=right | 2.7 km || 
|-id=679 bgcolor=#E9E9E9
| 23679 Andrewmoore ||  ||  || April 3, 1997 || Socorro || LINEAR || MAR || align=right | 4.0 km || 
|-id=680 bgcolor=#fefefe
| 23680 Kerryking ||  ||  || April 3, 1997 || Socorro || LINEAR || NYS || align=right | 3.0 km || 
|-id=681 bgcolor=#E9E9E9
| 23681 Prabhu ||  ||  || April 6, 1997 || Socorro || LINEAR || HEN || align=right | 3.4 km || 
|-id=682 bgcolor=#d6d6d6
| 23682 ||  || — || April 7, 1997 || La Silla || E. W. Elst || KOR || align=right | 4.0 km || 
|-id=683 bgcolor=#E9E9E9
| 23683 ||  || — || April 28, 1997 || Kitt Peak || Spacewatch || — || align=right | 4.1 km || 
|-id=684 bgcolor=#E9E9E9
| 23684 ||  || — || April 30, 1997 || Socorro || LINEAR || — || align=right | 3.9 km || 
|-id=685 bgcolor=#E9E9E9
| 23685 Toaldo || 1997 JV ||  || May 1, 1997 || Bologna || San Vittore Obs. || — || align=right | 4.6 km || 
|-id=686 bgcolor=#E9E9E9
| 23686 Songyuan ||  ||  || May 8, 1997 || Xinglong || SCAP || EUN || align=right | 5.1 km || 
|-id=687 bgcolor=#d6d6d6
| 23687 ||  || — || May 8, 1997 || Kitt Peak || Spacewatch || — || align=right | 12 km || 
|-id=688 bgcolor=#E9E9E9
| 23688 Josephjoachim ||  ||  || May 3, 1997 || La Silla || E. W. Elst || — || align=right | 4.9 km || 
|-id=689 bgcolor=#E9E9E9
| 23689 Jancuypers ||  ||  || May 3, 1997 || La Silla || E. W. Elst || — || align=right | 5.7 km || 
|-id=690 bgcolor=#E9E9E9
| 23690 ||  || — || May 9, 1997 || Xinglong || SCAP || — || align=right | 7.3 km || 
|-id=691 bgcolor=#E9E9E9
| 23691 Jefneve ||  ||  || May 3, 1997 || La Silla || E. W. Elst || — || align=right | 10 km || 
|-id=692 bgcolor=#E9E9E9
| 23692 Nandatianwenners || 1997 KA ||  || May 20, 1997 || Xinglong || SCAP || — || align=right | 7.1 km || 
|-id=693 bgcolor=#E9E9E9
| 23693 ||  || — || May 30, 1997 || Kitt Peak || Spacewatch || EUN || align=right | 4.5 km || 
|-id=694 bgcolor=#C2FFFF
| 23694 ||  || — || May 29, 1997 || Kitt Peak || Spacewatch || L5 || align=right | 32 km || 
|-id=695 bgcolor=#d6d6d6
| 23695 ||  || — || June 28, 1997 || Socorro || LINEAR || — || align=right | 13 km || 
|-id=696 bgcolor=#d6d6d6
| 23696 ||  || — || June 28, 1997 || Socorro || LINEAR || — || align=right | 7.4 km || 
|-id=697 bgcolor=#E9E9E9
| 23697 ||  || — || June 26, 1997 || Kitt Peak || Spacewatch || — || align=right | 2.8 km || 
|-id=698 bgcolor=#d6d6d6
| 23698 ||  || — || July 4, 1997 || Xinglong || SCAP || ANF || align=right | 4.7 km || 
|-id=699 bgcolor=#d6d6d6
| 23699 Paulgordan ||  ||  || July 8, 1997 || Prescott || P. G. Comba || — || align=right | 3.9 km || 
|-id=700 bgcolor=#d6d6d6
| 23700 || 1997 OZ || — || July 25, 1997 || Majorca || R. Pacheco, Á. López J. || THM || align=right | 5.9 km || 
|}

23701–23800 

|-bgcolor=#d6d6d6
| 23701 Liqibin ||  ||  || August 3, 1997 || Xinglong || SCAP || THM || align=right | 8.1 km || 
|-id=702 bgcolor=#E9E9E9
| 23702 ||  || — || August 28, 1997 || Cloudcroft || W. Offutt || — || align=right | 9.0 km || 
|-id=703 bgcolor=#d6d6d6
| 23703 ||  || — || September 3, 1997 || Oohira || T. Urata || HYG || align=right | 9.7 km || 
|-id=704 bgcolor=#fefefe
| 23704 ||  || — || September 23, 1997 || Xinglong || SCAP || MAS || align=right | 2.5 km || 
|-id=705 bgcolor=#fefefe
| 23705 ||  || — || September 28, 1997 || Kitt Peak || Spacewatch || V || align=right | 3.3 km || 
|-id=706 bgcolor=#C2FFFF
| 23706 ||  || — || September 29, 1997 || Kitt Peak || Spacewatch || L4 || align=right | 14 km || 
|-id=707 bgcolor=#d6d6d6
| 23707 Chambliss ||  ||  || October 4, 1997 || Chinle || J. Bruton || TIR || align=right | 7.2 km || 
|-id=708 bgcolor=#d6d6d6
| 23708 ||  || — || October 5, 1997 || Xinglong || SCAP || EOS || align=right | 8.5 km || 
|-id=709 bgcolor=#C2FFFF
| 23709 ||  || — || October 1, 1997 || La Silla || UDTS || L4 || align=right | 20 km || 
|-id=710 bgcolor=#C2FFFF
| 23710 || 1997 UJ || — || October 20, 1997 || Ondřejov || L. Kotková || L4 || align=right | 17 km || 
|-id=711 bgcolor=#d6d6d6
| 23711 ||  || — || October 25, 1997 || Oohira || T. Urata || — || align=right | 13 km || 
|-id=712 bgcolor=#fefefe
| 23712 Willpatrick || 1998 AA ||  || January 1, 1998 || Needville || W. G. Dillon, E. R. Dillon || — || align=right | 7.7 km || 
|-id=713 bgcolor=#fefefe
| 23713 ||  || — || March 2, 1998 || Caussols || ODAS || — || align=right | 1.6 km || 
|-id=714 bgcolor=#FFC2E0
| 23714 ||  || — || March 1, 1998 || Oizumi || T. Kobayashi || AMO +1km || align=right | 1.5 km || 
|-id=715 bgcolor=#fefefe
| 23715 ||  || — || March 20, 1998 || Socorro || LINEAR || H || align=right | 2.5 km || 
|-id=716 bgcolor=#fefefe
| 23716 ||  || — || March 31, 1998 || Socorro || LINEAR || — || align=right | 2.2 km || 
|-id=717 bgcolor=#fefefe
| 23717 Kaddoura ||  ||  || March 31, 1998 || Socorro || LINEAR || — || align=right | 3.1 km || 
|-id=718 bgcolor=#E9E9E9
| 23718 Horgos ||  ||  || April 2, 1998 || Piszkéstető || K. Sárneczky, L. Kiss || — || align=right | 2.9 km || 
|-id=719 bgcolor=#fefefe
| 23719 ||  || — || April 20, 1998 || Socorro || LINEAR || — || align=right | 1.7 km || 
|-id=720 bgcolor=#fefefe
| 23720 ||  || — || April 20, 1998 || Kitt Peak || Spacewatch || — || align=right | 2.9 km || 
|-id=721 bgcolor=#fefefe
| 23721 ||  || — || April 22, 1998 || Kitt Peak || Spacewatch || — || align=right | 3.7 km || 
|-id=722 bgcolor=#fefefe
| 23722 Gulak ||  ||  || April 20, 1998 || Socorro || LINEAR || FLO || align=right | 2.5 km || 
|-id=723 bgcolor=#fefefe
| 23723 ||  || — || April 20, 1998 || Socorro || LINEAR || — || align=right | 1.7 km || 
|-id=724 bgcolor=#fefefe
| 23724 ||  || — || April 24, 1998 || Kitt Peak || Spacewatch || — || align=right | 1.9 km || 
|-id=725 bgcolor=#fefefe
| 23725 ||  || — || April 23, 1998 || Haleakala || NEAT || — || align=right | 2.3 km || 
|-id=726 bgcolor=#FA8072
| 23726 ||  || — || April 20, 1998 || Socorro || LINEAR || — || align=right | 2.9 km || 
|-id=727 bgcolor=#fefefe
| 23727 Akihasan ||  ||  || April 30, 1998 || Nanyo || T. Okuni || — || align=right | 2.8 km || 
|-id=728 bgcolor=#fefefe
| 23728 Jasonmorrow ||  ||  || April 21, 1998 || Socorro || LINEAR || V || align=right | 3.4 km || 
|-id=729 bgcolor=#fefefe
| 23729 Kemeisha ||  ||  || April 21, 1998 || Socorro || LINEAR || FLO || align=right | 3.1 km || 
|-id=730 bgcolor=#fefefe
| 23730 Suncar ||  ||  || April 21, 1998 || Socorro || LINEAR || — || align=right | 3.0 km || 
|-id=731 bgcolor=#fefefe
| 23731 ||  || — || April 21, 1998 || Socorro || LINEAR || NYS || align=right | 2.7 km || 
|-id=732 bgcolor=#fefefe
| 23732 Choiseungjae ||  ||  || April 21, 1998 || Socorro || LINEAR || FLO || align=right | 2.2 km || 
|-id=733 bgcolor=#fefefe
| 23733 Hyojiyun ||  ||  || April 23, 1998 || Socorro || LINEAR || V || align=right | 3.1 km || 
|-id=734 bgcolor=#fefefe
| 23734 Kimgyehyun ||  ||  || April 23, 1998 || Socorro || LINEAR || — || align=right | 3.3 km || 
|-id=735 bgcolor=#fefefe
| 23735 Cohen ||  ||  || April 19, 1998 || Socorro || LINEAR || FLO || align=right | 3.4 km || 
|-id=736 bgcolor=#fefefe
| 23736 ||  || — || April 25, 1998 || La Silla || E. W. Elst || — || align=right | 2.2 km || 
|-id=737 bgcolor=#fefefe
| 23737 ||  || — || April 21, 1998 || Kitt Peak || Spacewatch || — || align=right | 5.0 km || 
|-id=738 bgcolor=#FA8072
| 23738 van Zyl ||  ||  || May 1, 1998 || Haleakala || NEAT || — || align=right | 3.4 km || 
|-id=739 bgcolor=#fefefe
| 23739 Kevin ||  ||  || May 18, 1998 || Anderson Mesa || LONEOS || — || align=right | 2.6 km || 
|-id=740 bgcolor=#fefefe
| 23740 ||  || — || May 25, 1998 || Woomera || F. B. Zoltowski || V || align=right | 2.5 km || 
|-id=741 bgcolor=#fefefe
| 23741 Takaaki ||  ||  || May 22, 1998 || Anderson Mesa || LONEOS || — || align=right | 6.2 km || 
|-id=742 bgcolor=#fefefe
| 23742 Okadatatsuaki ||  ||  || May 22, 1998 || Anderson Mesa || LONEOS || — || align=right | 2.2 km || 
|-id=743 bgcolor=#fefefe
| 23743 Toshikasuga ||  ||  || May 22, 1998 || Anderson Mesa || LONEOS || — || align=right | 2.3 km || 
|-id=744 bgcolor=#fefefe
| 23744 Ootsubo ||  ||  || May 22, 1998 || Anderson Mesa || LONEOS || — || align=right | 2.6 km || 
|-id=745 bgcolor=#fefefe
| 23745 Liadawley ||  ||  || May 22, 1998 || Socorro || LINEAR || FLO || align=right | 1.7 km || 
|-id=746 bgcolor=#fefefe
| 23746 ||  || — || May 22, 1998 || Socorro || LINEAR || — || align=right | 2.2 km || 
|-id=747 bgcolor=#fefefe
| 23747 Rahaelgupta ||  ||  || May 22, 1998 || Socorro || LINEAR || NYS || align=right | 5.4 km || 
|-id=748 bgcolor=#fefefe
| 23748 Kaarethode ||  ||  || May 22, 1998 || Socorro || LINEAR || FLO || align=right | 3.4 km || 
|-id=749 bgcolor=#fefefe
| 23749 Thygesen ||  ||  || May 22, 1998 || Socorro || LINEAR || FLO || align=right | 3.2 km || 
|-id=750 bgcolor=#fefefe
| 23750 Stepciechan ||  ||  || May 22, 1998 || Socorro || LINEAR || V || align=right | 2.1 km || 
|-id=751 bgcolor=#fefefe
| 23751 Davidprice ||  ||  || May 22, 1998 || Socorro || LINEAR || V || align=right | 3.1 km || 
|-id=752 bgcolor=#fefefe
| 23752 Jacobshapiro ||  ||  || May 22, 1998 || Socorro || LINEAR || — || align=right | 2.0 km || 
|-id=753 bgcolor=#fefefe
| 23753 Busdicker ||  ||  || May 22, 1998 || Socorro || LINEAR || — || align=right | 2.1 km || 
|-id=754 bgcolor=#fefefe
| 23754 Rachnareddy ||  ||  || May 22, 1998 || Socorro || LINEAR || — || align=right | 3.7 km || 
|-id=755 bgcolor=#fefefe
| 23755 Sergiolozano ||  ||  || May 22, 1998 || Socorro || LINEAR || — || align=right | 2.4 km || 
|-id=756 bgcolor=#fefefe
| 23756 Daniellozano ||  ||  || May 22, 1998 || Socorro || LINEAR || FLO || align=right | 2.2 km || 
|-id=757 bgcolor=#fefefe
| 23757 Jonmunoz ||  ||  || May 22, 1998 || Socorro || LINEAR || V || align=right | 2.3 km || 
|-id=758 bgcolor=#fefefe
| 23758 Guyuzhou ||  ||  || May 23, 1998 || Socorro || LINEAR || V || align=right | 2.7 km || 
|-id=759 bgcolor=#fefefe
| 23759 Wangzhaoxin ||  ||  || May 22, 1998 || Socorro || LINEAR || — || align=right | 1.8 km || 
|-id=760 bgcolor=#fefefe
| 23760 ||  || — || May 23, 1998 || Socorro || LINEAR || FLO || align=right | 1.7 km || 
|-id=761 bgcolor=#fefefe
| 23761 Yangliqing ||  ||  || May 22, 1998 || Socorro || LINEAR || V || align=right | 1.8 km || 
|-id=762 bgcolor=#fefefe
| 23762 ||  || — || May 22, 1998 || Socorro || LINEAR || V || align=right | 1.7 km || 
|-id=763 bgcolor=#fefefe
| 23763 ||  || — || June 24, 1998 || Lime Creek || R. Linderholm || — || align=right | 6.4 km || 
|-id=764 bgcolor=#E9E9E9
| 23764 ||  || — || June 21, 1998 || Kitt Peak || Spacewatch || EUN || align=right | 2.9 km || 
|-id=765 bgcolor=#E9E9E9
| 23765 ||  || — || June 27, 1998 || Kitt Peak || Spacewatch || EUN || align=right | 5.3 km || 
|-id=766 bgcolor=#fefefe
| 23766 ||  || — || June 25, 1998 || Kitt Peak || Spacewatch || V || align=right | 4.5 km || 
|-id=767 bgcolor=#fefefe
| 23767 ||  || — || June 24, 1998 || Socorro || LINEAR || — || align=right | 4.7 km || 
|-id=768 bgcolor=#fefefe
| 23768 Abu-Rmaileh ||  ||  || June 24, 1998 || Socorro || LINEAR || FLO || align=right | 3.1 km || 
|-id=769 bgcolor=#fefefe
| 23769 Russellbabb ||  ||  || June 24, 1998 || Socorro || LINEAR || — || align=right | 7.1 km || 
|-id=770 bgcolor=#fefefe
| 23770 ||  || — || June 24, 1998 || Socorro || LINEAR || — || align=right | 1.9 km || 
|-id=771 bgcolor=#fefefe
| 23771 Emaitchar ||  ||  || June 24, 1998 || Anderson Mesa || LONEOS || — || align=right | 3.3 km || 
|-id=772 bgcolor=#fefefe
| 23772 Masateru ||  ||  || June 24, 1998 || Anderson Mesa || LONEOS || — || align=right | 3.0 km || 
|-id=773 bgcolor=#fefefe
| 23773 Sarugaku ||  ||  || June 24, 1998 || Anderson Mesa || LONEOS || — || align=right | 5.3 km || 
|-id=774 bgcolor=#E9E9E9
| 23774 Herbelliott ||  ||  || June 26, 1998 || Reedy Creek || J. Broughton || — || align=right | 3.5 km || 
|-id=775 bgcolor=#E9E9E9
| 23775 Okudaira || 1998 PE ||  || August 2, 1998 || Anderson Mesa || LONEOS || — || align=right | 2.6 km || 
|-id=776 bgcolor=#E9E9E9
| 23776 Gosset || 1998 QE ||  || August 17, 1998 || Prescott || P. G. Comba || — || align=right | 5.0 km || 
|-id=777 bgcolor=#d6d6d6
| 23777 Goursat ||  ||  || August 23, 1998 || Prescott || P. G. Comba || EOS || align=right | 7.0 km || 
|-id=778 bgcolor=#d6d6d6
| 23778 ||  || — || August 17, 1998 || Socorro || LINEAR || — || align=right | 6.5 km || 
|-id=779 bgcolor=#E9E9E9
| 23779 Cambier ||  ||  || August 17, 1998 || Socorro || LINEAR || — || align=right | 2.8 km || 
|-id=780 bgcolor=#E9E9E9
| 23780 ||  || — || August 17, 1998 || Socorro || LINEAR || EUN || align=right | 3.4 km || 
|-id=781 bgcolor=#d6d6d6
| 23781 ||  || — || August 17, 1998 || Socorro || LINEAR || — || align=right | 8.0 km || 
|-id=782 bgcolor=#d6d6d6
| 23782 ||  || — || August 17, 1998 || Socorro || LINEAR || 7:4 || align=right | 17 km || 
|-id=783 bgcolor=#fefefe
| 23783 Alyssachan ||  ||  || August 17, 1998 || Socorro || LINEAR || V || align=right | 2.9 km || 
|-id=784 bgcolor=#d6d6d6
| 23784 ||  || — || August 22, 1998 || Bédoin || P. Antonini || — || align=right | 6.2 km || 
|-id=785 bgcolor=#E9E9E9
| 23785 ||  || — || August 17, 1998 || Socorro || LINEAR || DOR || align=right | 12 km || 
|-id=786 bgcolor=#E9E9E9
| 23786 ||  || — || August 17, 1998 || Socorro || LINEAR || EUN || align=right | 4.4 km || 
|-id=787 bgcolor=#fefefe
| 23787 ||  || — || August 17, 1998 || Socorro || LINEAR || V || align=right | 3.6 km || 
|-id=788 bgcolor=#fefefe
| 23788 Cofer ||  ||  || August 17, 1998 || Socorro || LINEAR || — || align=right | 3.6 km || 
|-id=789 bgcolor=#E9E9E9
| 23789 ||  || — || August 17, 1998 || Socorro || LINEAR || — || align=right | 3.2 km || 
|-id=790 bgcolor=#fefefe
| 23790 ||  || — || August 17, 1998 || Socorro || LINEAR || V || align=right | 3.6 km || 
|-id=791 bgcolor=#fefefe
| 23791 Kaysonconlin ||  ||  || August 17, 1998 || Socorro || LINEAR || — || align=right | 5.0 km || 
|-id=792 bgcolor=#fefefe
| 23792 Alyssacook ||  ||  || August 17, 1998 || Socorro || LINEAR || V || align=right | 2.7 km || 
|-id=793 bgcolor=#d6d6d6
| 23793 ||  || — || August 23, 1998 || Woomera || F. B. Zoltowski || THM || align=right | 6.8 km || 
|-id=794 bgcolor=#fefefe
| 23794 ||  || — || August 22, 1998 || Xinglong || SCAP || — || align=right | 2.8 km || 
|-id=795 bgcolor=#d6d6d6
| 23795 ||  || — || August 17, 1998 || Socorro || LINEAR || — || align=right | 10 km || 
|-id=796 bgcolor=#E9E9E9
| 23796 ||  || — || August 17, 1998 || Socorro || LINEAR || MAR || align=right | 5.9 km || 
|-id=797 bgcolor=#E9E9E9
| 23797 ||  || — || August 17, 1998 || Socorro || LINEAR || — || align=right | 3.7 km || 
|-id=798 bgcolor=#fefefe
| 23798 Samagonzalez ||  ||  || August 17, 1998 || Socorro || LINEAR || FLO || align=right | 3.0 km || 
|-id=799 bgcolor=#E9E9E9
| 23799 ||  || — || August 17, 1998 || Socorro || LINEAR || — || align=right | 3.2 km || 
|-id=800 bgcolor=#d6d6d6
| 23800 ||  || — || August 17, 1998 || Socorro || LINEAR || — || align=right | 4.6 km || 
|}

23801–23900 

|-bgcolor=#fefefe
| 23801 Erikgustafson ||  ||  || August 17, 1998 || Socorro || LINEAR || — || align=right | 3.0 km || 
|-id=802 bgcolor=#E9E9E9
| 23802 ||  || — || August 17, 1998 || Socorro || LINEAR || EUN || align=right | 4.9 km || 
|-id=803 bgcolor=#d6d6d6
| 23803 ||  || — || August 17, 1998 || Socorro || LINEAR || THM || align=right | 7.4 km || 
|-id=804 bgcolor=#fefefe
| 23804 Haber ||  ||  || August 17, 1998 || Socorro || LINEAR || Vslow || align=right | 2.3 km || 
|-id=805 bgcolor=#E9E9E9
| 23805 ||  || — || August 17, 1998 || Socorro || LINEAR || GEF || align=right | 4.1 km || 
|-id=806 bgcolor=#E9E9E9
| 23806 ||  || — || August 17, 1998 || Socorro || LINEAR || HOF || align=right | 7.7 km || 
|-id=807 bgcolor=#E9E9E9
| 23807 ||  || — || August 17, 1998 || Socorro || LINEAR || ADE || align=right | 9.9 km || 
|-id=808 bgcolor=#d6d6d6
| 23808 Joshuahammer ||  ||  || August 17, 1998 || Socorro || LINEAR || KOR || align=right | 3.5 km || 
|-id=809 bgcolor=#fefefe
| 23809 Haswell ||  ||  || August 17, 1998 || Socorro || LINEAR || — || align=right | 3.5 km || 
|-id=810 bgcolor=#fefefe
| 23810 ||  || — || August 17, 1998 || Socorro || LINEAR || — || align=right | 4.4 km || 
|-id=811 bgcolor=#E9E9E9
| 23811 Connorivens ||  ||  || August 17, 1998 || Socorro || LINEAR || — || align=right | 4.2 km || 
|-id=812 bgcolor=#E9E9E9
| 23812 Jannuzi ||  ||  || August 17, 1998 || Socorro || LINEAR || NEM || align=right | 5.4 km || 
|-id=813 bgcolor=#d6d6d6
| 23813 ||  || — || August 17, 1998 || Socorro || LINEAR || — || align=right | 11 km || 
|-id=814 bgcolor=#E9E9E9
| 23814 Bethanylynne ||  ||  || August 17, 1998 || Socorro || LINEAR || — || align=right | 5.0 km || 
|-id=815 bgcolor=#E9E9E9
| 23815 ||  || — || August 17, 1998 || Socorro || LINEAR || — || align=right | 4.6 km || 
|-id=816 bgcolor=#E9E9E9
| 23816 Rohitkamat ||  ||  || August 17, 1998 || Socorro || LINEAR || — || align=right | 4.2 km || 
|-id=817 bgcolor=#fefefe
| 23817 Gokulk ||  ||  || August 17, 1998 || Socorro || LINEAR || — || align=right | 5.1 km || 
|-id=818 bgcolor=#E9E9E9
| 23818 Matthewlepow ||  ||  || August 17, 1998 || Socorro || LINEAR || MRX || align=right | 3.9 km || 
|-id=819 bgcolor=#E9E9E9
| 23819 Tsuyoshi ||  ||  || August 27, 1998 || Anderson Mesa || LONEOS || HOF || align=right | 5.1 km || 
|-id=820 bgcolor=#E9E9E9
| 23820 ||  || — || August 24, 1998 || Socorro || LINEAR || ADE || align=right | 3.4 km || 
|-id=821 bgcolor=#d6d6d6
| 23821 Morganmonroe ||  ||  || August 24, 1998 || Socorro || LINEAR || EOS || align=right | 5.5 km || 
|-id=822 bgcolor=#d6d6d6
| 23822 ||  || — || August 24, 1998 || Socorro || LINEAR || EOS || align=right | 5.9 km || 
|-id=823 bgcolor=#d6d6d6
| 23823 ||  || — || August 24, 1998 || Socorro || LINEAR || — || align=right | 13 km || 
|-id=824 bgcolor=#d6d6d6
| 23824 ||  || — || August 24, 1998 || Socorro || LINEAR || — || align=right | 15 km || 
|-id=825 bgcolor=#E9E9E9
| 23825 ||  || — || August 24, 1998 || Socorro || LINEAR || — || align=right | 7.5 km || 
|-id=826 bgcolor=#E9E9E9
| 23826 ||  || — || August 24, 1998 || Socorro || LINEAR || — || align=right | 8.4 km || 
|-id=827 bgcolor=#d6d6d6
| 23827 ||  || — || August 24, 1998 || Socorro || LINEAR || — || align=right | 13 km || 
|-id=828 bgcolor=#E9E9E9
| 23828 ||  || — || August 24, 1998 || Socorro || LINEAR || — || align=right | 4.4 km || 
|-id=829 bgcolor=#E9E9E9
| 23829 ||  || — || August 24, 1998 || Socorro || LINEAR || EUN || align=right | 5.0 km || 
|-id=830 bgcolor=#E9E9E9
| 23830 ||  || — || August 24, 1998 || Socorro || LINEAR || PAL || align=right | 9.2 km || 
|-id=831 bgcolor=#d6d6d6
| 23831 Mattmooney ||  ||  || August 24, 1998 || Socorro || LINEAR || EOS || align=right | 6.3 km || 
|-id=832 bgcolor=#E9E9E9
| 23832 ||  || — || August 24, 1998 || Socorro || LINEAR || — || align=right | 3.4 km || 
|-id=833 bgcolor=#fefefe
| 23833 Mowers ||  ||  || August 28, 1998 || Socorro || LINEAR || FLO || align=right | 2.5 km || 
|-id=834 bgcolor=#fefefe
| 23834 Mukhopadhyay ||  ||  || August 28, 1998 || Socorro || LINEAR || NYS || align=right | 2.2 km || 
|-id=835 bgcolor=#E9E9E9
| 23835 ||  || — || August 28, 1998 || Socorro || LINEAR || — || align=right | 4.6 km || 
|-id=836 bgcolor=#E9E9E9
| 23836 ||  || — || August 17, 1998 || Socorro || LINEAR || — || align=right | 3.5 km || 
|-id=837 bgcolor=#fefefe
| 23837 Matthewnanni ||  ||  || August 17, 1998 || Socorro || LINEAR || NYS || align=right | 1.7 km || 
|-id=838 bgcolor=#E9E9E9
| 23838 ||  || — || August 19, 1998 || Socorro || LINEAR || — || align=right | 5.0 km || 
|-id=839 bgcolor=#E9E9E9
| 23839 ||  || — || August 26, 1998 || La Silla || E. W. Elst || — || align=right | 4.5 km || 
|-id=840 bgcolor=#E9E9E9
| 23840 ||  || — || August 26, 1998 || La Silla || E. W. Elst || HOF || align=right | 8.8 km || 
|-id=841 bgcolor=#d6d6d6
| 23841 ||  || — || August 26, 1998 || La Silla || E. W. Elst || — || align=right | 5.4 km || 
|-id=842 bgcolor=#E9E9E9
| 23842 ||  || — || August 25, 1998 || La Silla || E. W. Elst || — || align=right | 4.1 km || 
|-id=843 bgcolor=#d6d6d6
| 23843 ||  || — || August 25, 1998 || La Silla || E. W. Elst || — || align=right | 5.4 km || 
|-id=844 bgcolor=#fefefe
| 23844 Raghvendra ||  ||  || August 17, 1998 || Socorro || LINEAR || — || align=right | 2.7 km || 
|-id=845 bgcolor=#E9E9E9
| 23845 || 1998 RB || — || September 2, 1998 || Dynic || A. Sugie || — || align=right | 4.0 km || 
|-id=846 bgcolor=#E9E9E9
| 23846 || 1998 RF || — || September 1, 1998 || Woomera || F. B. Zoltowski || — || align=right | 5.7 km || 
|-id=847 bgcolor=#d6d6d6
| 23847 ||  || — || September 12, 1998 || Oizumi || T. Kobayashi || EOS || align=right | 6.2 km || 
|-id=848 bgcolor=#d6d6d6
| 23848 ||  || — || September 10, 1998 || Višnjan Observatory || Višnjan Obs. || — || align=right | 10 km || 
|-id=849 bgcolor=#E9E9E9
| 23849 ||  || — || September 14, 1998 || Socorro || LINEAR || — || align=right | 6.9 km || 
|-id=850 bgcolor=#E9E9E9
| 23850 Ramaswami ||  ||  || September 14, 1998 || Socorro || LINEAR || — || align=right | 3.8 km || 
|-id=851 bgcolor=#fefefe
| 23851 Rottman-Yang ||  ||  || September 14, 1998 || Socorro || LINEAR || NYS || align=right | 2.5 km || 
|-id=852 bgcolor=#d6d6d6
| 23852 Laurierumker ||  ||  || September 14, 1998 || Socorro || LINEAR || KOR || align=right | 4.6 km || 
|-id=853 bgcolor=#E9E9E9
| 23853 ||  || — || September 14, 1998 || Socorro || LINEAR || EUN || align=right | 5.6 km || 
|-id=854 bgcolor=#fefefe
| 23854 Rickschaffer ||  ||  || September 14, 1998 || Socorro || LINEAR || — || align=right | 5.2 km || 
|-id=855 bgcolor=#E9E9E9
| 23855 Brandonshih ||  ||  || September 14, 1998 || Socorro || LINEAR || — || align=right | 6.8 km || 
|-id=856 bgcolor=#d6d6d6
| 23856 ||  || — || September 14, 1998 || Socorro || LINEAR || — || align=right | 11 km || 
|-id=857 bgcolor=#fefefe
| 23857 ||  || — || September 14, 1998 || Socorro || LINEAR || — || align=right | 5.2 km || 
|-id=858 bgcolor=#E9E9E9
| 23858 Ambrosesoehn ||  ||  || September 14, 1998 || Socorro || LINEAR || — || align=right | 4.2 km || 
|-id=859 bgcolor=#E9E9E9
| 23859 ||  || — || September 14, 1998 || Socorro || LINEAR || — || align=right | 7.4 km || 
|-id=860 bgcolor=#E9E9E9
| 23860 ||  || — || September 14, 1998 || Socorro || LINEAR || — || align=right | 3.5 km || 
|-id=861 bgcolor=#d6d6d6
| 23861 Benjaminsong ||  ||  || September 14, 1998 || Socorro || LINEAR || KOR || align=right | 3.7 km || 
|-id=862 bgcolor=#fefefe
| 23862 ||  || — || September 14, 1998 || Socorro || LINEAR || — || align=right | 3.5 km || 
|-id=863 bgcolor=#d6d6d6
| 23863 ||  || — || September 14, 1998 || Socorro || LINEAR || EOS || align=right | 6.4 km || 
|-id=864 bgcolor=#d6d6d6
| 23864 ||  || — || September 14, 1998 || Socorro || LINEAR || ALA || align=right | 14 km || 
|-id=865 bgcolor=#E9E9E9
| 23865 Karlsorensen ||  ||  || September 14, 1998 || Socorro || LINEAR || — || align=right | 5.9 km || 
|-id=866 bgcolor=#d6d6d6
| 23866 ||  || — || September 14, 1998 || Socorro || LINEAR || THM || align=right | 8.8 km || 
|-id=867 bgcolor=#d6d6d6
| 23867 Cathsoto ||  ||  || September 14, 1998 || Socorro || LINEAR || HYG || align=right | 7.5 km || 
|-id=868 bgcolor=#d6d6d6
| 23868 ||  || — || September 14, 1998 || Socorro || LINEAR || KOR || align=right | 4.2 km || 
|-id=869 bgcolor=#E9E9E9
| 23869 ||  || — || September 14, 1998 || Socorro || LINEAR || — || align=right | 5.7 km || 
|-id=870 bgcolor=#d6d6d6
| 23870 ||  || — || September 14, 1998 || Socorro || LINEAR || — || align=right | 11 km || 
|-id=871 bgcolor=#fefefe
| 23871 ||  || — || September 14, 1998 || Socorro || LINEAR || ERI || align=right | 6.7 km || 
|-id=872 bgcolor=#d6d6d6
| 23872 ||  || — || September 14, 1998 || Socorro || LINEAR || KOR || align=right | 5.2 km || 
|-id=873 bgcolor=#d6d6d6
| 23873 ||  || — || September 14, 1998 || Socorro || LINEAR || KOR || align=right | 5.7 km || 
|-id=874 bgcolor=#E9E9E9
| 23874 ||  || — || September 14, 1998 || Socorro || LINEAR || — || align=right | 6.0 km || 
|-id=875 bgcolor=#E9E9E9
| 23875 Strube ||  ||  || September 14, 1998 || Socorro || LINEAR || — || align=right | 7.1 km || 
|-id=876 bgcolor=#E9E9E9
| 23876 ||  || — || September 14, 1998 || Socorro || LINEAR || AGN || align=right | 6.2 km || 
|-id=877 bgcolor=#d6d6d6
| 23877 Gourmaud || 1998 SP ||  || September 16, 1998 || Caussols || ODAS || HYG || align=right | 8.3 km || 
|-id=878 bgcolor=#d6d6d6
| 23878 ||  || — || September 18, 1998 || Caussols || ODAS || THM || align=right | 7.1 km || 
|-id=879 bgcolor=#d6d6d6
| 23879 Demura ||  ||  || September 17, 1998 || Anderson Mesa || LONEOS || — || align=right | 10 km || 
|-id=880 bgcolor=#E9E9E9
| 23880 Tongil ||  ||  || September 18, 1998 || Younchun || T. H. Lee || EUN || align=right | 7.8 km || 
|-id=881 bgcolor=#E9E9E9
| 23881 ||  || — || September 20, 1998 || Kitt Peak || Spacewatch || — || align=right | 4.9 km || 
|-id=882 bgcolor=#d6d6d6
| 23882 Fredcourant ||  ||  || September 22, 1998 || Caussols || ODAS || — || align=right | 7.2 km || 
|-id=883 bgcolor=#d6d6d6
| 23883 ||  || — || September 21, 1998 || Višnjan Observatory || Višnjan Obs. || KOR || align=right | 5.4 km || 
|-id=884 bgcolor=#E9E9E9
| 23884 Karenharvey ||  ||  || September 20, 1998 || Goodricke-Pigott || R. A. Tucker || EUN || align=right | 4.0 km || 
|-id=885 bgcolor=#E9E9E9
| 23885 ||  || — || September 16, 1998 || Caussols || ODAS || — || align=right | 3.7 km || 
|-id=886 bgcolor=#d6d6d6
| 23886 Toshihamane ||  ||  || September 17, 1998 || Anderson Mesa || LONEOS || — || align=right | 7.8 km || 
|-id=887 bgcolor=#d6d6d6
| 23887 Shinsukeabe ||  ||  || September 17, 1998 || Anderson Mesa || LONEOS || — || align=right | 4.5 km || 
|-id=888 bgcolor=#E9E9E9
| 23888 Daikinoshita ||  ||  || September 18, 1998 || Anderson Mesa || LONEOS || — || align=right | 4.0 km || 
|-id=889 bgcolor=#d6d6d6
| 23889 Hermanngrassmann ||  ||  || September 26, 1998 || Prescott || P. G. Comba || THM || align=right | 6.4 km || 
|-id=890 bgcolor=#E9E9E9
| 23890 Quindou ||  ||  || September 22, 1998 || Caussols || ODAS || HEN || align=right | 2.9 km || 
|-id=891 bgcolor=#d6d6d6
| 23891 ||  || — || September 23, 1998 || Višnjan Observatory || Višnjan Obs. || KAR || align=right | 3.7 km || 
|-id=892 bgcolor=#E9E9E9
| 23892 ||  || — || September 23, 1998 || Uccle || T. Pauwels || EUN || align=right | 4.2 km || 
|-id=893 bgcolor=#fefefe
| 23893 Lauman ||  ||  || September 16, 1998 || Anderson Mesa || LONEOS || NYS || align=right | 8.3 km || 
|-id=894 bgcolor=#d6d6d6
| 23894 Arikahiguchi ||  ||  || September 16, 1998 || Anderson Mesa || LONEOS || — || align=right | 5.3 km || 
|-id=895 bgcolor=#E9E9E9
| 23895 Akikonakamura ||  ||  || September 17, 1998 || Anderson Mesa || LONEOS || — || align=right | 5.0 km || 
|-id=896 bgcolor=#d6d6d6
| 23896 Tatsuaki ||  ||  || September 17, 1998 || Anderson Mesa || LONEOS || EOS || align=right | 7.1 km || 
|-id=897 bgcolor=#E9E9E9
| 23897 Daikuroda ||  ||  || September 17, 1998 || Anderson Mesa || LONEOS || — || align=right | 4.5 km || 
|-id=898 bgcolor=#d6d6d6
| 23898 Takir ||  ||  || September 17, 1998 || Anderson Mesa || LONEOS || THM || align=right | 14 km || 
|-id=899 bgcolor=#E9E9E9
| 23899 Kornoš ||  ||  || September 17, 1998 || Anderson Mesa || LONEOS || — || align=right | 5.7 km || 
|-id=900 bgcolor=#E9E9E9
| 23900 Urakawa ||  ||  || September 17, 1998 || Anderson Mesa || LONEOS || HOF || align=right | 11 km || 
|}

23901–24000 

|-bgcolor=#d6d6d6
| 23901 ||  || — || September 25, 1998 || Xinglong || SCAP || — || align=right | 4.0 km || 
|-id=902 bgcolor=#E9E9E9
| 23902 ||  || — || September 20, 1998 || La Silla || E. W. Elst || — || align=right | 4.4 km || 
|-id=903 bgcolor=#E9E9E9
| 23903 ||  || — || September 20, 1998 || La Silla || E. W. Elst || — || align=right | 6.6 km || 
|-id=904 bgcolor=#E9E9E9
| 23904 Amytang ||  ||  || September 21, 1998 || Socorro || LINEAR || — || align=right | 2.8 km || 
|-id=905 bgcolor=#d6d6d6
| 23905 ||  || — || September 21, 1998 || La Silla || E. W. Elst || — || align=right | 4.1 km || 
|-id=906 bgcolor=#d6d6d6
| 23906 ||  || — || September 21, 1998 || La Silla || E. W. Elst || THM || align=right | 8.8 km || 
|-id=907 bgcolor=#fefefe
| 23907 ||  || — || September 21, 1998 || La Silla || E. W. Elst || NYS || align=right | 2.6 km || 
|-id=908 bgcolor=#fefefe
| 23908 ||  || — || September 26, 1998 || Socorro || LINEAR || — || align=right | 4.3 km || 
|-id=909 bgcolor=#E9E9E9
| 23909 ||  || — || September 26, 1998 || Socorro || LINEAR || MAR || align=right | 4.4 km || 
|-id=910 bgcolor=#d6d6d6
| 23910 ||  || — || September 26, 1998 || Socorro || LINEAR || — || align=right | 8.3 km || 
|-id=911 bgcolor=#d6d6d6
| 23911 ||  || — || September 26, 1998 || Socorro || LINEAR || — || align=right | 11 km || 
|-id=912 bgcolor=#d6d6d6
| 23912 ||  || — || September 26, 1998 || Socorro || LINEAR || KOR || align=right | 4.9 km || 
|-id=913 bgcolor=#fefefe
| 23913 ||  || — || September 26, 1998 || Socorro || LINEAR || V || align=right | 3.1 km || 
|-id=914 bgcolor=#d6d6d6
| 23914 ||  || — || September 26, 1998 || Socorro || LINEAR || — || align=right | 6.3 km || 
|-id=915 bgcolor=#d6d6d6
| 23915 ||  || — || September 26, 1998 || Socorro || LINEAR || — || align=right | 8.9 km || 
|-id=916 bgcolor=#d6d6d6
| 23916 ||  || — || September 26, 1998 || Socorro || LINEAR || HYG || align=right | 10 km || 
|-id=917 bgcolor=#d6d6d6
| 23917 ||  || — || September 26, 1998 || Socorro || LINEAR || — || align=right | 6.6 km || 
|-id=918 bgcolor=#d6d6d6
| 23918 ||  || — || September 26, 1998 || Socorro || LINEAR || — || align=right | 16 km || 
|-id=919 bgcolor=#d6d6d6
| 23919 ||  || — || September 26, 1998 || Socorro || LINEAR || — || align=right | 8.9 km || 
|-id=920 bgcolor=#d6d6d6
| 23920 ||  || — || September 26, 1998 || Socorro || LINEAR || — || align=right | 9.8 km || 
|-id=921 bgcolor=#d6d6d6
| 23921 ||  || — || September 26, 1998 || Socorro || LINEAR || CRO || align=right | 12 km || 
|-id=922 bgcolor=#d6d6d6
| 23922 Tawadros ||  ||  || September 26, 1998 || Socorro || LINEAR || — || align=right | 9.9 km || 
|-id=923 bgcolor=#E9E9E9
| 23923 ||  || — || September 26, 1998 || Socorro || LINEAR || JUN || align=right | 7.8 km || 
|-id=924 bgcolor=#fefefe
| 23924 Premt ||  ||  || September 26, 1998 || Socorro || LINEAR || NYS || align=right | 3.0 km || 
|-id=925 bgcolor=#d6d6d6
| 23925 ||  || — || September 26, 1998 || Socorro || LINEAR || — || align=right | 5.0 km || 
|-id=926 bgcolor=#E9E9E9
| 23926 ||  || — || September 26, 1998 || Socorro || LINEAR || — || align=right | 4.2 km || 
|-id=927 bgcolor=#d6d6d6
| 23927 ||  || — || September 20, 1998 || La Silla || E. W. Elst || — || align=right | 5.9 km || 
|-id=928 bgcolor=#d6d6d6
| 23928 Darbywoodard ||  ||  || September 26, 1998 || Socorro || LINEAR || — || align=right | 7.1 km || 
|-id=929 bgcolor=#E9E9E9
| 23929 ||  || — || September 18, 1998 || La Silla || E. W. Elst || — || align=right | 5.2 km || 
|-id=930 bgcolor=#d6d6d6
| 23930 ||  || — || September 18, 1998 || La Silla || E. W. Elst || EOS || align=right | 7.5 km || 
|-id=931 bgcolor=#fefefe
| 23931 Ibuki ||  ||  || September 21, 1998 || Anderson Mesa || LONEOS || — || align=right | 5.6 km || 
|-id=932 bgcolor=#fefefe
| 23932 ||  || — || October 13, 1998 || Caussols || ODAS || V || align=right | 1.7 km || 
|-id=933 bgcolor=#d6d6d6
| 23933 ||  || — || October 14, 1998 || Catalina || CSS || EUP || align=right | 9.9 km || 
|-id=934 bgcolor=#d6d6d6
| 23934 ||  || — || October 13, 1998 || Višnjan Observatory || K. Korlević || — || align=right | 15 km || 
|-id=935 bgcolor=#d6d6d6
| 23935 ||  || — || October 13, 1998 || Višnjan Observatory || K. Korlević || — || align=right | 4.4 km || 
|-id=936 bgcolor=#d6d6d6
| 23936 ||  || — || October 13, 1998 || Višnjan Observatory || K. Korlević || URS || align=right | 13 km || 
|-id=937 bgcolor=#fefefe
| 23937 Delibes ||  ||  || October 15, 1998 || Caussols || ODAS || FLO || align=right | 1.9 km || 
|-id=938 bgcolor=#d6d6d6
| 23938 Kurosaki ||  ||  || October 14, 1998 || Anderson Mesa || LONEOS || — || align=right | 8.2 km || 
|-id=939 bgcolor=#C2FFFF
| 23939 ||  || — || October 14, 1998 || Anderson Mesa || LONEOS || L4 || align=right | 24 km || 
|-id=940 bgcolor=#fefefe
| 23940 || 1998 UE || — || October 16, 1998 || Catalina || CSS || PHO || align=right | 4.3 km || 
|-id=941 bgcolor=#E9E9E9
| 23941 ||  || — || October 16, 1998 || Višnjan Observatory || K. Korlević || EUN || align=right | 7.2 km || 
|-id=942 bgcolor=#d6d6d6
| 23942 ||  || — || October 16, 1998 || Višnjan Observatory || K. Korlević || EOS || align=right | 7.6 km || 
|-id=943 bgcolor=#E9E9E9
| 23943 ||  || — || October 20, 1998 || Caussols || ODAS || — || align=right | 3.7 km || 
|-id=944 bgcolor=#E9E9E9
| 23944 Dusser ||  ||  || October 20, 1998 || Caussols || ODAS || — || align=right | 4.9 km || 
|-id=945 bgcolor=#d6d6d6
| 23945 ||  || — || October 20, 1998 || Caussols || ODAS || — || align=right | 11 km || 
|-id=946 bgcolor=#d6d6d6
| 23946 Marcelleroux ||  ||  || October 22, 1998 || Caussols || ODAS || EOS || align=right | 9.0 km || 
|-id=947 bgcolor=#C2FFFF
| 23947 ||  || — || October 23, 1998 || Caussols || ODAS || L4 || align=right | 19 km || 
|-id=948 bgcolor=#d6d6d6
| 23948 ||  || — || October 25, 1998 || Oizumi || T. Kobayashi || EOS || align=right | 9.6 km || 
|-id=949 bgcolor=#d6d6d6
| 23949 Dazapata ||  ||  || October 28, 1998 || Socorro || LINEAR || — || align=right | 4.9 km || 
|-id=950 bgcolor=#E9E9E9
| 23950 Tsusakamoto ||  ||  || October 18, 1998 || Anderson Mesa || LONEOS || — || align=right | 3.5 km || 
|-id=951 bgcolor=#d6d6d6
| 23951 ||  || — || October 18, 1998 || La Silla || E. W. Elst || JLI || align=right | 10 km || 
|-id=952 bgcolor=#d6d6d6
| 23952 ||  || — || October 18, 1998 || La Silla || E. W. Elst || EOS || align=right | 8.2 km || 
|-id=953 bgcolor=#E9E9E9
| 23953 ||  || — || October 18, 1998 || La Silla || E. W. Elst || — || align=right | 8.7 km || 
|-id=954 bgcolor=#d6d6d6
| 23954 ||  || — || October 28, 1998 || Socorro || LINEAR || — || align=right | 6.3 km || 
|-id=955 bgcolor=#d6d6d6
| 23955 Nishikota ||  ||  || October 18, 1998 || Anderson Mesa || LONEOS || — || align=right | 5.6 km || 
|-id=956 bgcolor=#d6d6d6
| 23956 ||  || — || November 10, 1998 || Socorro || LINEAR || FIR || align=right | 13 km || 
|-id=957 bgcolor=#d6d6d6
| 23957 ||  || — || November 10, 1998 || Socorro || LINEAR || — || align=right | 5.5 km || 
|-id=958 bgcolor=#C2FFFF
| 23958 ||  || — || November 10, 1998 || Socorro || LINEAR || L4slow || align=right | 46 km || 
|-id=959 bgcolor=#E9E9E9
| 23959 ||  || — || November 10, 1998 || Socorro || LINEAR || — || align=right | 6.7 km || 
|-id=960 bgcolor=#E9E9E9
| 23960 ||  || — || November 10, 1998 || Socorro || LINEAR || EUN || align=right | 4.7 km || 
|-id=961 bgcolor=#d6d6d6
| 23961 ||  || — || November 11, 1998 || Socorro || LINEAR || — || align=right | 12 km || 
|-id=962 bgcolor=#d6d6d6
| 23962 ||  || — || November 18, 1998 || Oizumi || T. Kobayashi || — || align=right | 10 km || 
|-id=963 bgcolor=#C2FFFF
| 23963 ||  || — || November 18, 1998 || Chichibu || N. Satō || L4 || align=right | 20 km || 
|-id=964 bgcolor=#d6d6d6
| 23964 ||  || — || November 21, 1998 || Socorro || LINEAR || — || align=right | 9.2 km || 
|-id=965 bgcolor=#d6d6d6
| 23965 ||  || — || November 21, 1998 || Socorro || LINEAR || EOS || align=right | 6.8 km || 
|-id=966 bgcolor=#E9E9E9
| 23966 ||  || — || November 18, 1998 || Socorro || LINEAR || — || align=right | 4.4 km || 
|-id=967 bgcolor=#d6d6d6
| 23967 ||  || — || December 14, 1998 || Višnjan Observatory || K. Korlević || — || align=right | 10 km || 
|-id=968 bgcolor=#C2FFFF
| 23968 ||  || — || December 8, 1998 || Caussols || ODAS || L4 || align=right | 31 km || 
|-id=969 bgcolor=#d6d6d6
| 23969 ||  || — || December 15, 1998 || Socorro || LINEAR || — || align=right | 12 km || 
|-id=970 bgcolor=#C2FFFF
| 23970 ||  || — || December 21, 1998 || Caussols || ODAS || L4 || align=right | 32 km || 
|-id=971 bgcolor=#fefefe
| 23971 ||  || — || December 25, 1998 || Višnjan Observatory || K. Korlević, M. Jurić || — || align=right | 8.3 km || 
|-id=972 bgcolor=#d6d6d6
| 23972 || 1999 AA || — || January 3, 1999 || Oizumi || T. Kobayashi || EOS || align=right | 8.3 km || 
|-id=973 bgcolor=#d6d6d6
| 23973 ||  || — || February 5, 1999 || Xinglong || SCAP || EOS || align=right | 11 km || 
|-id=974 bgcolor=#fefefe
| 23974 ||  || — || February 12, 1999 || Socorro || LINEAR || H || align=right | 2.0 km || 
|-id=975 bgcolor=#fefefe
| 23975 Akran ||  ||  || February 12, 1999 || Socorro || LINEAR || — || align=right | 3.3 km || 
|-id=976 bgcolor=#E9E9E9
| 23976 ||  || — || February 23, 1999 || Socorro || LINEAR || EUN || align=right | 3.7 km || 
|-id=977 bgcolor=#E9E9E9
| 23977 ||  || — || April 14, 1999 || Socorro || LINEAR || — || align=right | 16 km || 
|-id=978 bgcolor=#E9E9E9
| 23978 ||  || — || May 10, 1999 || Socorro || LINEAR || — || align=right | 6.3 km || 
|-id=979 bgcolor=#E9E9E9
| 23979 ||  || — || May 12, 1999 || Socorro || LINEAR || — || align=right | 4.9 km || 
|-id=980 bgcolor=#fefefe
| 23980 Ogden ||  ||  || May 14, 1999 || Socorro || LINEAR || V || align=right | 3.2 km || 
|-id=981 bgcolor=#fefefe
| 23981 Patjohnson ||  ||  || June 9, 1999 || Socorro || LINEAR || V || align=right | 2.5 km || 
|-id=982 bgcolor=#E9E9E9
| 23982 ||  || — || June 9, 1999 || Socorro || LINEAR || — || align=right | 6.5 km || 
|-id=983 bgcolor=#FA8072
| 23983 ||  || — || July 13, 1999 || Socorro || LINEAR || — || align=right | 2.7 km || 
|-id=984 bgcolor=#E9E9E9
| 23984 ||  || — || July 14, 1999 || Socorro || LINEAR || EUN || align=right | 4.1 km || 
|-id=985 bgcolor=#E9E9E9
| 23985 ||  || — || July 12, 1999 || Socorro || LINEAR || EUN || align=right | 5.8 km || 
|-id=986 bgcolor=#d6d6d6
| 23986 ||  || — || July 12, 1999 || Socorro || LINEAR || TIR || align=right | 5.2 km || 
|-id=987 bgcolor=#C2FFFF
| 23987 ||  || — || July 13, 1999 || Socorro || LINEAR || L5 || align=right | 21 km || 
|-id=988 bgcolor=#d6d6d6
| 23988 Maungakiekie || 1999 RB ||  || September 2, 1999 || Auckland || I. P. Griffin || ITH || align=right | 5.3 km || 
|-id=989 bgcolor=#E9E9E9
| 23989 Farpoint || 1999 RF ||  || September 3, 1999 || Farpoint || G. Hug, G. Bell || — || align=right | 3.5 km || 
|-id=990 bgcolor=#fefefe
| 23990 Springsteen ||  ||  || September 4, 1999 || Auckland || I. P. Griffin || — || align=right | 1.6 km || 
|-id=991 bgcolor=#fefefe
| 23991 ||  || — || September 6, 1999 || Višnjan Observatory || K. Korlević || NYS || align=right | 4.1 km || 
|-id=992 bgcolor=#fefefe
| 23992 Markhobbs ||  ||  || September 7, 1999 || Socorro || LINEAR || FLO || align=right | 1.8 km || 
|-id=993 bgcolor=#E9E9E9
| 23993 ||  || — || September 7, 1999 || Socorro || LINEAR || EUN || align=right | 4.2 km || 
|-id=994 bgcolor=#fefefe
| 23994 Mayhan ||  ||  || September 7, 1999 || Socorro || LINEAR || NYS || align=right | 1.9 km || 
|-id=995 bgcolor=#fefefe
| 23995 Oechsle ||  ||  || September 7, 1999 || Socorro || LINEAR || NYS || align=right | 1.8 km || 
|-id=996 bgcolor=#fefefe
| 23996 ||  || — || September 8, 1999 || Višnjan Observatory || K. Korlević || — || align=right | 2.7 km || 
|-id=997 bgcolor=#E9E9E9
| 23997 ||  || — || September 8, 1999 || Višnjan Observatory || K. Korlević || — || align=right | 7.0 km || 
|-id=998 bgcolor=#fefefe
| 23998 ||  || — || September 8, 1999 || Socorro || LINEAR || H || align=right | 1.6 km || 
|-id=999 bgcolor=#fefefe
| 23999 Rinner ||  ||  || September 9, 1999 || Saint-Michel-sur-Meurthe || L. Bernasconi || — || align=right | 5.2 km || 
|-id=000 bgcolor=#fefefe
| 24000 Patrickdufour ||  ||  || September 10, 1999 || Saint-Michel-sur-Meurthe || L. Bernasconi || FLO || align=right | 2.0 km || 
|}

References

External links 
 Discovery Circumstances: Numbered Minor Planets (20001)–(25000) (IAU Minor Planet Center)

0023